

595001–595100 

|-bgcolor=#fefefe
| 595001 ||  || — || September 3, 2000 || Socorro || LINEAR ||  || align=right data-sort-value="0.94" | 940 m || 
|-id=002 bgcolor=#fefefe
| 595002 ||  || — || March 19, 2009 || Mount Lemmon || Mount Lemmon Survey ||  || align=right data-sort-value="0.52" | 520 m || 
|-id=003 bgcolor=#E9E9E9
| 595003 ||  || — || September 24, 2000 || Socorro || LINEAR ||  || align=right data-sort-value="0.61" | 610 m || 
|-id=004 bgcolor=#d6d6d6
| 595004 ||  || — || September 23, 2000 || Anderson Mesa || LONEOS || Tj (2.99) || align=right | 3.1 km || 
|-id=005 bgcolor=#E9E9E9
| 595005 ||  || — || January 23, 2015 || Haleakala || Pan-STARRS ||  || align=right | 1.1 km || 
|-id=006 bgcolor=#E9E9E9
| 595006 ||  || — || August 21, 2004 || Siding Spring || SSS ||  || align=right data-sort-value="0.99" | 990 m || 
|-id=007 bgcolor=#d6d6d6
| 595007 ||  || — || March 1, 2008 || Kitt Peak || Spacewatch ||  || align=right | 2.3 km || 
|-id=008 bgcolor=#d6d6d6
| 595008 ||  || — || September 21, 2000 || Kitt Peak || R. Millis, R. M. Wagner ||  || align=right | 2.1 km || 
|-id=009 bgcolor=#fefefe
| 595009 ||  || — || September 14, 2007 || Mount Lemmon || Mount Lemmon Survey ||  || align=right data-sort-value="0.55" | 550 m || 
|-id=010 bgcolor=#fefefe
| 595010 ||  || — || November 18, 2007 || Mount Lemmon || Mount Lemmon Survey ||  || align=right data-sort-value="0.62" | 620 m || 
|-id=011 bgcolor=#fefefe
| 595011 ||  || — || September 21, 2000 || Kitt Peak || R. Millis, R. M. Wagner ||  || align=right data-sort-value="0.51" | 510 m || 
|-id=012 bgcolor=#fefefe
| 595012 ||  || — || October 3, 2011 || Mount Lemmon || Mount Lemmon Survey ||  || align=right data-sort-value="0.64" | 640 m || 
|-id=013 bgcolor=#d6d6d6
| 595013 ||  || — || May 21, 2004 || Kitt Peak || Spacewatch ||  || align=right | 2.3 km || 
|-id=014 bgcolor=#fefefe
| 595014 ||  || — || September 19, 2014 || Haleakala || Pan-STARRS ||  || align=right data-sort-value="0.57" | 570 m || 
|-id=015 bgcolor=#fefefe
| 595015 ||  || — || August 28, 2011 || Haleakala || Pan-STARRS ||  || align=right data-sort-value="0.66" | 660 m || 
|-id=016 bgcolor=#C2FFFF
| 595016 ||  || — || October 15, 2012 || Haleakala || Pan-STARRS || L5 || align=right | 8.3 km || 
|-id=017 bgcolor=#fefefe
| 595017 ||  || — || October 1, 2000 || Socorro || LINEAR ||  || align=right data-sort-value="0.79" | 790 m || 
|-id=018 bgcolor=#fefefe
| 595018 ||  || — || October 4, 2000 || Bergisch Gladbach || W. Bickel ||  || align=right data-sort-value="0.62" | 620 m || 
|-id=019 bgcolor=#E9E9E9
| 595019 ||  || — || October 3, 2000 || Kitt Peak || Spacewatch ||  || align=right | 1.1 km || 
|-id=020 bgcolor=#E9E9E9
| 595020 ||  || — || May 26, 2003 || Kitt Peak || Spacewatch ||  || align=right | 1.4 km || 
|-id=021 bgcolor=#E9E9E9
| 595021 ||  || — || January 26, 2006 || Kitt Peak || Spacewatch ||  || align=right | 1.2 km || 
|-id=022 bgcolor=#C2FFFF
| 595022 ||  || — || October 11, 2012 || Mount Lemmon || Mount Lemmon Survey || L5 || align=right | 7.9 km || 
|-id=023 bgcolor=#d6d6d6
| 595023 ||  || — || October 10, 2012 || Haleakala || Pan-STARRS ||  || align=right | 2.5 km || 
|-id=024 bgcolor=#E9E9E9
| 595024 ||  || — || January 20, 2015 || Haleakala || Pan-STARRS ||  || align=right data-sort-value="0.95" | 950 m || 
|-id=025 bgcolor=#fefefe
| 595025 ||  || — || November 24, 2011 || Mount Lemmon || Mount Lemmon Survey ||  || align=right data-sort-value="0.48" | 480 m || 
|-id=026 bgcolor=#E9E9E9
| 595026 ||  || — || March 27, 2011 || Mount Lemmon || Mount Lemmon Survey ||  || align=right data-sort-value="0.91" | 910 m || 
|-id=027 bgcolor=#fefefe
| 595027 ||  || — || October 31, 2000 || Socorro || LINEAR ||  || align=right data-sort-value="0.84" | 840 m || 
|-id=028 bgcolor=#E9E9E9
| 595028 ||  || — || October 6, 2008 || Mount Lemmon || Mount Lemmon Survey ||  || align=right data-sort-value="0.91" | 910 m || 
|-id=029 bgcolor=#d6d6d6
| 595029 ||  || — || August 31, 2017 || Haleakala || Pan-STARRS ||  || align=right | 2.7 km || 
|-id=030 bgcolor=#E9E9E9
| 595030 ||  || — || October 26, 2000 || Kitt Peak || Spacewatch ||  || align=right data-sort-value="0.87" | 870 m || 
|-id=031 bgcolor=#fefefe
| 595031 ||  || — || November 1, 2000 || Socorro || LINEAR ||  || align=right | 1.1 km || 
|-id=032 bgcolor=#d6d6d6
| 595032 ||  || — || November 27, 2000 || Kitt Peak || Spacewatch ||  || align=right | 1.8 km || 
|-id=033 bgcolor=#E9E9E9
| 595033 ||  || — || February 10, 2014 || Haleakala || Pan-STARRS ||  || align=right | 1.1 km || 
|-id=034 bgcolor=#fefefe
| 595034 ||  || — || January 13, 2011 || Mount Lemmon || Mount Lemmon Survey ||  || align=right data-sort-value="0.54" | 540 m || 
|-id=035 bgcolor=#fefefe
| 595035 ||  || — || September 14, 2007 || Mount Lemmon || Mount Lemmon Survey ||  || align=right data-sort-value="0.68" | 680 m || 
|-id=036 bgcolor=#d6d6d6
| 595036 ||  || — || November 6, 2016 || Mount Lemmon || Mount Lemmon Survey ||  || align=right | 2.2 km || 
|-id=037 bgcolor=#fefefe
| 595037 ||  || — || March 15, 2012 || Mount Lemmon || Mount Lemmon Survey ||  || align=right data-sort-value="0.56" | 560 m || 
|-id=038 bgcolor=#d6d6d6
| 595038 ||  || — || October 11, 2005 || Kitt Peak || Spacewatch ||  || align=right | 2.2 km || 
|-id=039 bgcolor=#fefefe
| 595039 ||  || — || February 9, 2005 || Mount Lemmon || Mount Lemmon Survey ||  || align=right data-sort-value="0.65" | 650 m || 
|-id=040 bgcolor=#E9E9E9
| 595040 ||  || — || December 21, 2000 || Kitt Peak || Spacewatch ||  || align=right data-sort-value="0.85" | 850 m || 
|-id=041 bgcolor=#E9E9E9
| 595041 ||  || — || December 21, 2000 || Kitt Peak || Spacewatch ||  || align=right | 2.0 km || 
|-id=042 bgcolor=#fefefe
| 595042 ||  || — || August 27, 2003 || Palomar || NEAT ||  || align=right data-sort-value="0.79" | 790 m || 
|-id=043 bgcolor=#E9E9E9
| 595043 ||  || — || January 30, 2014 || Kitt Peak || Spacewatch ||  || align=right | 1.8 km || 
|-id=044 bgcolor=#d6d6d6
| 595044 ||  || — || May 3, 2008 || Kitt Peak || Spacewatch ||  || align=right | 2.5 km || 
|-id=045 bgcolor=#fefefe
| 595045 ||  || — || December 25, 2000 || Kitt Peak || Spacewatch ||  || align=right data-sort-value="0.60" | 600 m || 
|-id=046 bgcolor=#E9E9E9
| 595046 ||  || — || December 21, 2000 || Bohyunsan || Bohyunsan Obs. ||  || align=right | 1.3 km || 
|-id=047 bgcolor=#E9E9E9
| 595047 ||  || — || January 4, 2001 || Haleakala || AMOS ||  || align=right data-sort-value="0.84" | 840 m || 
|-id=048 bgcolor=#d6d6d6
| 595048 ||  || — || January 19, 2001 || Kitt Peak || Spacewatch ||  || align=right | 2.2 km || 
|-id=049 bgcolor=#E9E9E9
| 595049 ||  || — || December 29, 2000 || Haleakala || AMOS || EUN || align=right | 1.3 km || 
|-id=050 bgcolor=#fefefe
| 595050 ||  || — || January 20, 2009 || Mount Lemmon || Mount Lemmon Survey ||  || align=right data-sort-value="0.81" | 810 m || 
|-id=051 bgcolor=#d6d6d6
| 595051 ||  || — || April 1, 2013 || Mount Lemmon || Mount Lemmon Survey ||  || align=right | 2.0 km || 
|-id=052 bgcolor=#E9E9E9
| 595052 ||  || — || February 13, 2001 || Kitt Peak || Spacewatch ||  || align=right | 1.4 km || 
|-id=053 bgcolor=#E9E9E9
| 595053 ||  || — || August 1, 2016 || Haleakala || Pan-STARRS ||  || align=right | 1.3 km || 
|-id=054 bgcolor=#C2FFFF
| 595054 ||  || — || February 2, 2001 || Kitt Peak || Spacewatch || L4 || align=right | 8.1 km || 
|-id=055 bgcolor=#E9E9E9
| 595055 ||  || — || February 2, 2001 || Kitt Peak || Spacewatch ||  || align=right | 1.4 km || 
|-id=056 bgcolor=#d6d6d6
| 595056 ||  || — || February 16, 2001 || Kitt Peak || Spacewatch ||  || align=right | 2.5 km || 
|-id=057 bgcolor=#d6d6d6
| 595057 ||  || — || February 16, 2001 || Kitt Peak || Spacewatch || EOS || align=right | 1.8 km || 
|-id=058 bgcolor=#d6d6d6
| 595058 ||  || — || February 22, 2001 || Kitt Peak || Spacewatch ||  || align=right | 2.8 km || 
|-id=059 bgcolor=#fefefe
| 595059 ||  || — || August 31, 2005 || Kitt Peak || Spacewatch ||  || align=right data-sort-value="0.44" | 440 m || 
|-id=060 bgcolor=#fefefe
| 595060 ||  || — || May 15, 2005 || Mount Lemmon || Mount Lemmon Survey ||  || align=right data-sort-value="0.88" | 880 m || 
|-id=061 bgcolor=#E9E9E9
| 595061 ||  || — || February 15, 2010 || Kitt Peak || Spacewatch ||  || align=right | 1.2 km || 
|-id=062 bgcolor=#C2FFFF
| 595062 ||  || — || March 15, 2004 || Kitt Peak || Spacewatch || L4 || align=right | 8.1 km || 
|-id=063 bgcolor=#E9E9E9
| 595063 ||  || — || August 29, 2002 || Palomar || NEAT ||  || align=right | 2.6 km || 
|-id=064 bgcolor=#d6d6d6
| 595064 ||  || — || February 1, 2012 || Kitt Peak || Spacewatch ||  || align=right | 2.6 km || 
|-id=065 bgcolor=#d6d6d6
| 595065 ||  || — || January 20, 2018 || Haleakala || Pan-STARRS ||  || align=right | 2.4 km || 
|-id=066 bgcolor=#d6d6d6
| 595066 ||  || — || November 28, 2016 || Haleakala || Pan-STARRS ||  || align=right | 2.5 km || 
|-id=067 bgcolor=#d6d6d6
| 595067 ||  || — || March 13, 2007 || Mount Lemmon || Mount Lemmon Survey ||  || align=right | 2.2 km || 
|-id=068 bgcolor=#d6d6d6
| 595068 ||  || — || March 20, 2007 || Mount Lemmon || Mount Lemmon Survey ||  || align=right | 2.0 km || 
|-id=069 bgcolor=#C2FFFF
| 595069 ||  || — || October 29, 2008 || Mount Lemmon || Mount Lemmon Survey || L4 || align=right | 8.1 km || 
|-id=070 bgcolor=#d6d6d6
| 595070 ||  || — || January 2, 2012 || Mount Lemmon || Mount Lemmon Survey ||  || align=right | 2.2 km || 
|-id=071 bgcolor=#fefefe
| 595071 ||  || — || March 15, 2001 || Kitt Peak || Spacewatch ||  || align=right data-sort-value="0.67" | 670 m || 
|-id=072 bgcolor=#d6d6d6
| 595072 ||  || — || April 22, 2007 || Kitt Peak || Spacewatch ||  || align=right | 2.7 km || 
|-id=073 bgcolor=#fefefe
| 595073 ||  || — || February 3, 2012 || Mount Lemmon || Mount Lemmon Survey ||  || align=right data-sort-value="0.71" | 710 m || 
|-id=074 bgcolor=#d6d6d6
| 595074 ||  || — || March 18, 2007 || Kitt Peak || Spacewatch ||  || align=right | 2.0 km || 
|-id=075 bgcolor=#E9E9E9
| 595075 ||  || — || October 18, 2003 || Kitt Peak || Spacewatch ||  || align=right | 1.9 km || 
|-id=076 bgcolor=#fefefe
| 595076 ||  || — || January 13, 2008 || Kitt Peak || Spacewatch ||  || align=right data-sort-value="0.44" | 440 m || 
|-id=077 bgcolor=#d6d6d6
| 595077 ||  || — || August 15, 2009 || Kitt Peak || Spacewatch ||  || align=right | 2.9 km || 
|-id=078 bgcolor=#E9E9E9
| 595078 ||  || — || March 21, 2001 || Kitt Peak || Kitt Peak Obs. ||  || align=right data-sort-value="0.95" | 950 m || 
|-id=079 bgcolor=#E9E9E9
| 595079 ||  || — || September 22, 2003 || Kitt Peak || Spacewatch || JUN || align=right data-sort-value="0.59" | 590 m || 
|-id=080 bgcolor=#fefefe
| 595080 ||  || — || February 12, 2004 || Kitt Peak || Spacewatch ||  || align=right data-sort-value="0.46" | 460 m || 
|-id=081 bgcolor=#d6d6d6
| 595081 ||  || — || March 23, 2001 || Kitt Peak || Kitt Peak Obs. || HYG || align=right | 2.2 km || 
|-id=082 bgcolor=#d6d6d6
| 595082 ||  || — || October 14, 2009 || Mount Lemmon || Mount Lemmon Survey ||  || align=right | 1.5 km || 
|-id=083 bgcolor=#fefefe
| 595083 ||  || — || November 6, 2010 || Mount Lemmon || Mount Lemmon Survey ||  || align=right data-sort-value="0.95" | 950 m || 
|-id=084 bgcolor=#d6d6d6
| 595084 ||  || — || December 5, 2005 || Mount Lemmon || Mount Lemmon Survey ||  || align=right | 2.5 km || 
|-id=085 bgcolor=#E9E9E9
| 595085 ||  || — || November 20, 2008 || Kitt Peak || Spacewatch ||  || align=right | 2.0 km || 
|-id=086 bgcolor=#d6d6d6
| 595086 ||  || — || December 27, 2011 || Mount Lemmon || Mount Lemmon Survey ||  || align=right | 2.6 km || 
|-id=087 bgcolor=#fefefe
| 595087 ||  || — || March 1, 2008 || Kitt Peak || Spacewatch ||  || align=right data-sort-value="0.64" | 640 m || 
|-id=088 bgcolor=#d6d6d6
| 595088 ||  || — || October 8, 2004 || Kitt Peak || Spacewatch ||  || align=right | 3.2 km || 
|-id=089 bgcolor=#C2FFFF
| 595089 ||  || — || October 22, 2009 || Mount Lemmon || Mount Lemmon Survey || L4 || align=right | 8.6 km || 
|-id=090 bgcolor=#d6d6d6
| 595090 ||  || — || January 19, 2012 || Haleakala || Pan-STARRS ||  || align=right | 2.1 km || 
|-id=091 bgcolor=#d6d6d6
| 595091 ||  || — || March 16, 2001 || Kitt Peak || Spacewatch ||  || align=right | 2.4 km || 
|-id=092 bgcolor=#d6d6d6
| 595092 ||  || — || March 19, 2001 || Kitt Peak || Spacewatch ||  || align=right | 2.3 km || 
|-id=093 bgcolor=#fefefe
| 595093 ||  || — || April 23, 2001 || Socorro || LINEAR ||  || align=right | 1.0 km || 
|-id=094 bgcolor=#fefefe
| 595094 ||  || — || April 30, 2005 || Kitt Peak || Spacewatch ||  || align=right data-sort-value="0.69" | 690 m || 
|-id=095 bgcolor=#d6d6d6
| 595095 ||  || — || February 17, 2018 || Mount Lemmon || Mount Lemmon Survey ||  || align=right | 2.0 km || 
|-id=096 bgcolor=#fefefe
| 595096 ||  || — || August 12, 2013 || Kitt Peak || Spacewatch ||  || align=right data-sort-value="0.67" | 670 m || 
|-id=097 bgcolor=#fefefe
| 595097 ||  || — || August 30, 2016 || Haleakala || Pan-STARRS ||  || align=right data-sort-value="0.75" | 750 m || 
|-id=098 bgcolor=#fefefe
| 595098 ||  || — || October 17, 2010 || Mount Lemmon || Mount Lemmon Survey ||  || align=right data-sort-value="0.50" | 500 m || 
|-id=099 bgcolor=#E9E9E9
| 595099 ||  || — || August 30, 2016 || Haleakala || Pan-STARRS ||  || align=right | 2.1 km || 
|-id=100 bgcolor=#E9E9E9
| 595100 ||  || — || June 28, 2015 || Haleakala || Pan-STARRS ||  || align=right | 1.5 km || 
|}

595101–595200 

|-bgcolor=#fefefe
| 595101 ||  || — || January 18, 2008 || Kitt Peak || Spacewatch ||  || align=right data-sort-value="0.54" | 540 m || 
|-id=102 bgcolor=#E9E9E9
| 595102 ||  || — || October 18, 2007 || Mount Lemmon || Mount Lemmon Survey ||  || align=right | 1.6 km || 
|-id=103 bgcolor=#fefefe
| 595103 ||  || — || March 31, 2008 || Mount Lemmon || Mount Lemmon Survey ||  || align=right data-sort-value="0.57" | 570 m || 
|-id=104 bgcolor=#d6d6d6
| 595104 ||  || — || October 5, 2004 || Kitt Peak || Spacewatch ||  || align=right | 2.7 km || 
|-id=105 bgcolor=#d6d6d6
| 595105 ||  || — || June 15, 2001 || Socorro || LINEAR || Tj (2.99) || align=right | 4.4 km || 
|-id=106 bgcolor=#E9E9E9
| 595106 ||  || — || February 4, 2005 || Palomar || NEAT ||  || align=right | 1.4 km || 
|-id=107 bgcolor=#d6d6d6
| 595107 ||  || — || January 23, 2011 || Mount Lemmon || Mount Lemmon Survey ||  || align=right | 2.3 km || 
|-id=108 bgcolor=#fefefe
| 595108 ||  || — || April 30, 1997 || Kitt Peak || Spacewatch ||  || align=right | 1.0 km || 
|-id=109 bgcolor=#d6d6d6
| 595109 ||  || — || July 25, 2001 || Haleakala || AMOS ||  || align=right | 2.9 km || 
|-id=110 bgcolor=#fefefe
| 595110 ||  || — || August 26, 2009 || Catalina || CSS ||  || align=right | 1.1 km || 
|-id=111 bgcolor=#E9E9E9
| 595111 ||  || — || July 19, 2001 || Palomar || NEAT ||  || align=right | 2.6 km || 
|-id=112 bgcolor=#E9E9E9
| 595112 ||  || — || August 11, 2001 || Palomar || NEAT ||  || align=right | 2.1 km || 
|-id=113 bgcolor=#E9E9E9
| 595113 ||  || — || November 27, 2014 || Mount Lemmon || Mount Lemmon Survey ||  || align=right | 1.1 km || 
|-id=114 bgcolor=#fefefe
| 595114 ||  || — || August 16, 2001 || Palomar || NEAT || H || align=right data-sort-value="0.80" | 800 m || 
|-id=115 bgcolor=#d6d6d6
| 595115 ||  || — || August 21, 2001 || Kitt Peak || Spacewatch ||  || align=right | 1.8 km || 
|-id=116 bgcolor=#FFC2E0
| 595116 ||  || — || August 21, 2001 || Kitt Peak || Spacewatch || AMO || align=right data-sort-value="0.093" | 93 m || 
|-id=117 bgcolor=#fefefe
| 595117 ||  || — || August 23, 2001 || Socorro || LINEAR || H || align=right data-sort-value="0.75" | 750 m || 
|-id=118 bgcolor=#FA8072
| 595118 ||  || — || August 17, 2001 || Socorro || LINEAR ||  || align=right data-sort-value="0.74" | 740 m || 
|-id=119 bgcolor=#E9E9E9
| 595119 ||  || — || August 15, 2001 || Haleakala || AMOS ||  || align=right | 2.1 km || 
|-id=120 bgcolor=#E9E9E9
| 595120 ||  || — || August 19, 2001 || Cerro Tololo || Cerro Tololo Obs. ||  || align=right | 1.4 km || 
|-id=121 bgcolor=#d6d6d6
| 595121 ||  || — || August 19, 2001 || Cerro Tololo || Cerro Tololo Obs. ||  || align=right | 2.2 km || 
|-id=122 bgcolor=#fefefe
| 595122 ||  || — || April 15, 2013 || Haleakala || Pan-STARRS ||  || align=right data-sort-value="0.54" | 540 m || 
|-id=123 bgcolor=#fefefe
| 595123 ||  || — || January 27, 2006 || Mount Lemmon || Mount Lemmon Survey ||  || align=right data-sort-value="0.42" | 420 m || 
|-id=124 bgcolor=#d6d6d6
| 595124 ||  || — || August 24, 2001 || Socorro || LINEAR ||  || align=right | 2.8 km || 
|-id=125 bgcolor=#fefefe
| 595125 ||  || — || July 30, 2001 || Bergisch Gladbach || W. Bickel ||  || align=right data-sort-value="0.75" | 750 m || 
|-id=126 bgcolor=#fefefe
| 595126 ||  || — || August 17, 2001 || Palomar || NEAT ||  || align=right data-sort-value="0.70" | 700 m || 
|-id=127 bgcolor=#d6d6d6
| 595127 ||  || — || August 29, 2006 || Kitt Peak || Spacewatch ||  || align=right | 2.4 km || 
|-id=128 bgcolor=#E9E9E9
| 595128 ||  || — || September 11, 2001 || Kitt Peak || Spacewatch ||  || align=right data-sort-value="0.64" | 640 m || 
|-id=129 bgcolor=#d6d6d6
| 595129 ||  || — || August 16, 2001 || Palomar || NEAT ||  || align=right | 3.6 km || 
|-id=130 bgcolor=#d6d6d6
| 595130 ||  || — || September 17, 2001 || Socorro || LINEAR ||  || align=right | 2.4 km || 
|-id=131 bgcolor=#d6d6d6
| 595131 ||  || — || September 19, 2001 || Kitt Peak || Spacewatch ||  || align=right | 2.2 km || 
|-id=132 bgcolor=#fefefe
| 595132 ||  || — || September 19, 2001 || Kitt Peak || Spacewatch ||  || align=right data-sort-value="0.73" | 730 m || 
|-id=133 bgcolor=#d6d6d6
| 595133 ||  || — || September 19, 2001 || Kitt Peak || Spacewatch || 3:2 || align=right | 4.0 km || 
|-id=134 bgcolor=#fefefe
| 595134 ||  || — || August 18, 2001 || Palomar || NEAT ||  || align=right data-sort-value="0.69" | 690 m || 
|-id=135 bgcolor=#E9E9E9
| 595135 ||  || — || September 18, 2001 || Kitt Peak || Spacewatch ||  || align=right | 1.9 km || 
|-id=136 bgcolor=#E9E9E9
| 595136 ||  || — || September 17, 2001 || Kitt Peak || Spacewatch ||  || align=right data-sort-value="0.99" | 990 m || 
|-id=137 bgcolor=#E9E9E9
| 595137 ||  || — || August 16, 2001 || Socorro || LINEAR ||  || align=right data-sort-value="0.86" | 860 m || 
|-id=138 bgcolor=#fefefe
| 595138 ||  || — || September 21, 2001 || Socorro || LINEAR ||  || align=right data-sort-value="0.67" | 670 m || 
|-id=139 bgcolor=#fefefe
| 595139 ||  || — || September 20, 2001 || Kitt Peak || Spacewatch ||  || align=right data-sort-value="0.87" | 870 m || 
|-id=140 bgcolor=#d6d6d6
| 595140 ||  || — || August 17, 2001 || Palomar || NEAT || AEG || align=right | 3.2 km || 
|-id=141 bgcolor=#fefefe
| 595141 ||  || — || October 20, 2012 || Haleakala || Pan-STARRS ||  || align=right data-sort-value="0.80" | 800 m || 
|-id=142 bgcolor=#d6d6d6
| 595142 ||  || — || November 14, 2007 || Kitt Peak || Spacewatch ||  || align=right | 2.4 km || 
|-id=143 bgcolor=#E9E9E9
| 595143 ||  || — || September 18, 2001 || Kitt Peak || Spacewatch ||  || align=right data-sort-value="0.92" | 920 m || 
|-id=144 bgcolor=#d6d6d6
| 595144 ||  || — || January 18, 2008 || Kitt Peak || Spacewatch ||  || align=right | 2.2 km || 
|-id=145 bgcolor=#fefefe
| 595145 ||  || — || September 21, 2001 || Socorro || LINEAR ||  || align=right data-sort-value="0.90" | 900 m || 
|-id=146 bgcolor=#d6d6d6
| 595146 ||  || — || October 10, 2001 || Palomar || NEAT || EOS || align=right | 2.5 km || 
|-id=147 bgcolor=#d6d6d6
| 595147 ||  || — || October 10, 2001 || Palomar || NEAT ||  || align=right | 3.4 km || 
|-id=148 bgcolor=#fefefe
| 595148 ||  || — || September 25, 2001 || Socorro || LINEAR ||  || align=right data-sort-value="0.91" | 910 m || 
|-id=149 bgcolor=#E9E9E9
| 595149 ||  || — || October 13, 2001 || Palomar || NEAT ||  || align=right | 1.2 km || 
|-id=150 bgcolor=#fefefe
| 595150 ||  || — || April 14, 2004 || Kitt Peak || Spacewatch ||  || align=right data-sort-value="0.96" | 960 m || 
|-id=151 bgcolor=#fefefe
| 595151 ||  || — || December 28, 2013 || Kitt Peak || Spacewatch ||  || align=right data-sort-value="0.82" | 820 m || 
|-id=152 bgcolor=#d6d6d6
| 595152 ||  || — || January 15, 2018 || Haleakala || Pan-STARRS ||  || align=right | 1.8 km || 
|-id=153 bgcolor=#E9E9E9
| 595153 ||  || — || October 14, 2001 || Apache Point || SDSS Collaboration ||  || align=right data-sort-value="0.57" | 570 m || 
|-id=154 bgcolor=#FA8072
| 595154 ||  || — || October 16, 2001 || Socorro || LINEAR ||  || align=right | 1.0 km || 
|-id=155 bgcolor=#E9E9E9
| 595155 ||  || — || October 13, 2001 || Anderson Mesa || LONEOS ||  || align=right | 2.5 km || 
|-id=156 bgcolor=#E9E9E9
| 595156 ||  || — || October 12, 2001 || Anderson Mesa || LONEOS ||  || align=right | 1.7 km || 
|-id=157 bgcolor=#fefefe
| 595157 ||  || — || September 20, 2001 || Socorro || LINEAR ||  || align=right data-sort-value="0.72" | 720 m || 
|-id=158 bgcolor=#FA8072
| 595158 ||  || — || October 10, 2001 || Palomar || NEAT || H || align=right data-sort-value="0.69" | 690 m || 
|-id=159 bgcolor=#d6d6d6
| 595159 ||  || — || October 20, 2001 || Socorro || LINEAR ||  || align=right | 2.7 km || 
|-id=160 bgcolor=#E9E9E9
| 595160 ||  || — || October 20, 2001 || Socorro || LINEAR ||  || align=right | 1.1 km || 
|-id=161 bgcolor=#E9E9E9
| 595161 ||  || — || October 22, 2001 || Socorro || LINEAR ||  || align=right | 1.5 km || 
|-id=162 bgcolor=#d6d6d6
| 595162 ||  || — || October 18, 2001 || Palomar || NEAT ||  || align=right | 3.2 km || 
|-id=163 bgcolor=#d6d6d6
| 595163 ||  || — || October 23, 2001 || Socorro || LINEAR ||  || align=right | 2.6 km || 
|-id=164 bgcolor=#d6d6d6
| 595164 ||  || — || October 18, 2001 || Palomar || NEAT ||  || align=right | 2.3 km || 
|-id=165 bgcolor=#fefefe
| 595165 ||  || — || September 28, 2009 || Mount Lemmon || Mount Lemmon Survey || H || align=right data-sort-value="0.52" | 520 m || 
|-id=166 bgcolor=#fefefe
| 595166 ||  || — || March 14, 2011 || Kitt Peak || Spacewatch ||  || align=right data-sort-value="0.81" | 810 m || 
|-id=167 bgcolor=#E9E9E9
| 595167 ||  || — || November 1, 2005 || Mount Lemmon || Mount Lemmon Survey ||  || align=right data-sort-value="0.50" | 500 m || 
|-id=168 bgcolor=#d6d6d6
| 595168 ||  || — || November 4, 2007 || Kitt Peak || Spacewatch ||  || align=right | 2.3 km || 
|-id=169 bgcolor=#fefefe
| 595169 ||  || — || April 30, 2016 || Mount Lemmon || Mount Lemmon Survey ||  || align=right data-sort-value="0.50" | 500 m || 
|-id=170 bgcolor=#fefefe
| 595170 ||  || — || November 8, 2008 || Kitt Peak || Spacewatch ||  || align=right data-sort-value="0.57" | 570 m || 
|-id=171 bgcolor=#d6d6d6
| 595171 ||  || — || October 21, 2001 || Socorro || LINEAR ||  || align=right | 2.7 km || 
|-id=172 bgcolor=#d6d6d6
| 595172 ||  || — || November 11, 2001 || Apache Point || SDSS Collaboration ||  || align=right | 2.5 km || 
|-id=173 bgcolor=#d6d6d6
| 595173 ||  || — || January 1, 2008 || Kitt Peak || Spacewatch ||  || align=right | 2.1 km || 
|-id=174 bgcolor=#d6d6d6
| 595174 ||  || — || November 12, 2001 || Apache Point || SDSS Collaboration ||  || align=right | 2.4 km || 
|-id=175 bgcolor=#d6d6d6
| 595175 ||  || — || September 25, 2017 || Haleakala || Pan-STARRS ||  || align=right | 1.9 km || 
|-id=176 bgcolor=#fefefe
| 595176 ||  || — || November 19, 2001 || Socorro || LINEAR || H || align=right data-sort-value="0.57" | 570 m || 
|-id=177 bgcolor=#fefefe
| 595177 ||  || — || November 16, 2001 || Kitt Peak || Spacewatch || H || align=right data-sort-value="0.45" | 450 m || 
|-id=178 bgcolor=#fefefe
| 595178 ||  || — || November 20, 2001 || Socorro || LINEAR || H || align=right data-sort-value="0.61" | 610 m || 
|-id=179 bgcolor=#fefefe
| 595179 ||  || — || November 17, 2001 || Kitt Peak || Spacewatch ||  || align=right data-sort-value="0.63" | 630 m || 
|-id=180 bgcolor=#d6d6d6
| 595180 ||  || — || November 17, 2001 || Socorro || LINEAR ||  || align=right | 2.9 km || 
|-id=181 bgcolor=#d6d6d6
| 595181 ||  || — || November 19, 2001 || Socorro || LINEAR ||  || align=right | 2.9 km || 
|-id=182 bgcolor=#E9E9E9
| 595182 ||  || — || November 20, 2001 || Socorro || LINEAR ||  || align=right | 2.0 km || 
|-id=183 bgcolor=#d6d6d6
| 595183 ||  || — || November 20, 2001 || Socorro || LINEAR ||  || align=right | 3.0 km || 
|-id=184 bgcolor=#fefefe
| 595184 ||  || — || November 30, 2005 || Mount Lemmon || Mount Lemmon Survey ||  || align=right data-sort-value="0.90" | 900 m || 
|-id=185 bgcolor=#d6d6d6
| 595185 ||  || — || November 17, 2001 || Kitt Peak || Spacewatch ||  || align=right | 2.7 km || 
|-id=186 bgcolor=#fefefe
| 595186 ||  || — || December 10, 2001 || Socorro || LINEAR ||  || align=right data-sort-value="0.71" | 710 m || 
|-id=187 bgcolor=#E9E9E9
| 595187 ||  || — || December 7, 2001 || Kitt Peak || Spacewatch ||  || align=right | 1.2 km || 
|-id=188 bgcolor=#E9E9E9
| 595188 ||  || — || December 14, 2001 || Socorro || LINEAR ||  || align=right | 1.0 km || 
|-id=189 bgcolor=#fefefe
| 595189 ||  || — || November 19, 2001 || Anderson Mesa || LONEOS || H || align=right data-sort-value="0.63" | 630 m || 
|-id=190 bgcolor=#d6d6d6
| 595190 ||  || — || October 12, 2006 || Palomar || NEAT ||  || align=right | 2.6 km || 
|-id=191 bgcolor=#fefefe
| 595191 ||  || — || December 14, 2001 || Kitt Peak || Spacewatch ||  || align=right data-sort-value="0.55" | 550 m || 
|-id=192 bgcolor=#E9E9E9
| 595192 ||  || — || January 11, 2002 || Anderson Mesa || LONEOS ||  || align=right data-sort-value="0.73" | 730 m || 
|-id=193 bgcolor=#FA8072
| 595193 ||  || — || December 22, 2001 || Socorro || LINEAR ||  || align=right | 1.4 km || 
|-id=194 bgcolor=#d6d6d6
| 595194 ||  || — || December 13, 2001 || Palomar || NEAT ||  || align=right | 4.1 km || 
|-id=195 bgcolor=#d6d6d6
| 595195 ||  || — || December 18, 2001 || Socorro || LINEAR ||  || align=right | 3.7 km || 
|-id=196 bgcolor=#d6d6d6
| 595196 ||  || — || December 18, 2001 || Kitt Peak || Spacewatch ||  || align=right | 3.0 km || 
|-id=197 bgcolor=#d6d6d6
| 595197 ||  || — || December 20, 2001 || Apache Point || SDSS Collaboration ||  || align=right | 3.1 km || 
|-id=198 bgcolor=#fefefe
| 595198 ||  || — || October 12, 2007 || Mount Lemmon || Mount Lemmon Survey ||  || align=right data-sort-value="0.66" | 660 m || 
|-id=199 bgcolor=#E9E9E9
| 595199 ||  || — || November 30, 2005 || Kitt Peak || Spacewatch ||  || align=right data-sort-value="0.67" | 670 m || 
|-id=200 bgcolor=#E9E9E9
| 595200 ||  || — || January 9, 2002 || Socorro || LINEAR ||  || align=right data-sort-value="0.72" | 720 m || 
|}

595201–595300 

|-bgcolor=#d6d6d6
| 595201 ||  || — || January 8, 2002 || Socorro || LINEAR ||  || align=right | 3.0 km || 
|-id=202 bgcolor=#FA8072
| 595202 ||  || — || January 11, 2002 || Socorro || LINEAR ||  || align=right | 2.5 km || 
|-id=203 bgcolor=#E9E9E9
| 595203 ||  || — || January 14, 2002 || Anderson Mesa || LONEOS ||  || align=right data-sort-value="0.94" | 940 m || 
|-id=204 bgcolor=#fefefe
| 595204 ||  || — || December 22, 2008 || Mount Lemmon || Mount Lemmon Survey ||  || align=right data-sort-value="0.69" | 690 m || 
|-id=205 bgcolor=#d6d6d6
| 595205 ||  || — || November 15, 2006 || Mount Lemmon || Mount Lemmon Survey ||  || align=right | 2.6 km || 
|-id=206 bgcolor=#d6d6d6
| 595206 ||  || — || August 9, 2015 || Haleakala || Pan-STARRS ||  || align=right | 2.5 km || 
|-id=207 bgcolor=#d6d6d6
| 595207 ||  || — || August 27, 2014 || Haleakala || Pan-STARRS ||  || align=right | 2.3 km || 
|-id=208 bgcolor=#fefefe
| 595208 ||  || — || July 8, 2003 || Palomar || NEAT || H || align=right data-sort-value="0.75" | 750 m || 
|-id=209 bgcolor=#d6d6d6
| 595209 ||  || — || January 14, 2002 || Kitt Peak || Spacewatch ||  || align=right | 2.0 km || 
|-id=210 bgcolor=#E9E9E9
| 595210 ||  || — || January 12, 2002 || Kitt Peak || Spacewatch ||  || align=right | 1.6 km || 
|-id=211 bgcolor=#E9E9E9
| 595211 ||  || — || February 15, 1994 || Kitt Peak || Spacewatch ||  || align=right data-sort-value="0.94" | 940 m || 
|-id=212 bgcolor=#fefefe
| 595212 ||  || — || October 6, 2016 || Haleakala || Pan-STARRS ||  || align=right data-sort-value="0.93" | 930 m || 
|-id=213 bgcolor=#E9E9E9
| 595213 ||  || — || January 19, 2002 || Kitt Peak || Spacewatch ||  || align=right data-sort-value="0.78" | 780 m || 
|-id=214 bgcolor=#fefefe
| 595214 ||  || — || February 20, 2015 || Haleakala || Pan-STARRS || H || align=right data-sort-value="0.60" | 600 m || 
|-id=215 bgcolor=#fefefe
| 595215 ||  || — || February 6, 2002 || Socorro || LINEAR || H || align=right data-sort-value="0.72" | 720 m || 
|-id=216 bgcolor=#E9E9E9
| 595216 ||  || — || February 8, 2002 || Socorro || LINEAR ||  || align=right | 1.1 km || 
|-id=217 bgcolor=#E9E9E9
| 595217 ||  || — || January 8, 2002 || Palomar || NEAT ||  || align=right | 1.4 km || 
|-id=218 bgcolor=#d6d6d6
| 595218 ||  || — || January 20, 2002 || Anderson Mesa || LONEOS ||  || align=right | 2.6 km || 
|-id=219 bgcolor=#E9E9E9
| 595219 ||  || — || February 7, 2002 || Palomar || NEAT ||  || align=right data-sort-value="0.95" | 950 m || 
|-id=220 bgcolor=#E9E9E9
| 595220 ||  || — || February 7, 2002 || Palomar || NEAT ||  || align=right | 1.0 km || 
|-id=221 bgcolor=#E9E9E9
| 595221 ||  || — || February 13, 2002 || Kitt Peak || Spacewatch ||  || align=right | 1.1 km || 
|-id=222 bgcolor=#d6d6d6
| 595222 ||  || — || February 7, 2002 || Palomar || NEAT ||  || align=right | 1.8 km || 
|-id=223 bgcolor=#E9E9E9
| 595223 ||  || — || February 7, 2002 || Palomar || NEAT ||  || align=right | 1.4 km || 
|-id=224 bgcolor=#E9E9E9
| 595224 ||  || — || July 24, 2011 || Siding Spring || SSS ||  || align=right | 2.4 km || 
|-id=225 bgcolor=#E9E9E9
| 595225 ||  || — || March 28, 2015 || Haleakala || Pan-STARRS ||  || align=right data-sort-value="0.81" | 810 m || 
|-id=226 bgcolor=#fefefe
| 595226 ||  || — || October 9, 2007 || Mount Lemmon || Mount Lemmon Survey ||  || align=right data-sort-value="0.64" | 640 m || 
|-id=227 bgcolor=#d6d6d6
| 595227 ||  || — || February 8, 2013 || Haleakala || Pan-STARRS ||  || align=right | 2.6 km || 
|-id=228 bgcolor=#E9E9E9
| 595228 ||  || — || October 7, 2004 || Kitt Peak || Spacewatch ||  || align=right data-sort-value="0.82" | 820 m || 
|-id=229 bgcolor=#fefefe
| 595229 ||  || — || September 15, 2007 || Mount Lemmon || Mount Lemmon Survey ||  || align=right data-sort-value="0.71" | 710 m || 
|-id=230 bgcolor=#E9E9E9
| 595230 ||  || — || November 11, 2013 || Kitt Peak || Spacewatch ||  || align=right | 1.5 km || 
|-id=231 bgcolor=#d6d6d6
| 595231 ||  || — || February 13, 2002 || Kitt Peak || Spacewatch ||  || align=right | 2.0 km || 
|-id=232 bgcolor=#E9E9E9
| 595232 ||  || — || March 13, 2007 || Kitt Peak || Spacewatch ||  || align=right | 1.6 km || 
|-id=233 bgcolor=#C2FFFF
| 595233 ||  || — || December 2, 2010 || Mount Lemmon || Mount Lemmon Survey || L4 || align=right | 5.8 km || 
|-id=234 bgcolor=#E9E9E9
| 595234 ||  || — || February 17, 2015 || Haleakala || Pan-STARRS ||  || align=right | 1.7 km || 
|-id=235 bgcolor=#d6d6d6
| 595235 ||  || — || August 29, 2005 || Kitt Peak || Spacewatch || 7:4 || align=right | 3.3 km || 
|-id=236 bgcolor=#d6d6d6
| 595236 ||  || — || December 24, 2006 || Kitt Peak || Spacewatch ||  || align=right | 2.3 km || 
|-id=237 bgcolor=#d6d6d6
| 595237 ||  || — || February 6, 2002 || Kitt Peak || R. Millis, M. W. Buie ||  || align=right | 2.1 km || 
|-id=238 bgcolor=#C2FFFF
| 595238 ||  || — || September 3, 2008 || Kitt Peak || Spacewatch || L4 || align=right | 6.8 km || 
|-id=239 bgcolor=#d6d6d6
| 595239 ||  || — || February 21, 2002 || Kitt Peak || Spacewatch ||  || align=right | 1.9 km || 
|-id=240 bgcolor=#d6d6d6
| 595240 ||  || — || December 15, 2006 || Kitt Peak || Spacewatch ||  || align=right | 2.0 km || 
|-id=241 bgcolor=#C2FFFF
| 595241 ||  || — || January 17, 2013 || Haleakala || Pan-STARRS || L4 || align=right | 6.5 km || 
|-id=242 bgcolor=#d6d6d6
| 595242 ||  || — || February 20, 2002 || Kitt Peak || Spacewatch ||  || align=right | 2.6 km || 
|-id=243 bgcolor=#d6d6d6
| 595243 ||  || — || March 5, 2002 || Kitt Peak || Spacewatch ||  || align=right | 2.4 km || 
|-id=244 bgcolor=#d6d6d6
| 595244 ||  || — || March 3, 2002 || Kanab || E. E. Sheridan ||  || align=right | 4.0 km || 
|-id=245 bgcolor=#d6d6d6
| 595245 ||  || — || March 13, 2002 || Socorro || LINEAR || Tj (2.93) || align=right | 2.4 km || 
|-id=246 bgcolor=#E9E9E9
| 595246 ||  || — || March 9, 2002 || Anderson Mesa || LONEOS ||  || align=right | 1.5 km || 
|-id=247 bgcolor=#E9E9E9
| 595247 ||  || — || March 9, 2002 || Kitt Peak || Spacewatch ||  || align=right | 1.5 km || 
|-id=248 bgcolor=#E9E9E9
| 595248 ||  || — || March 6, 2002 || Palomar || NEAT ||  || align=right | 1.3 km || 
|-id=249 bgcolor=#d6d6d6
| 595249 ||  || — || March 12, 2002 || Palomar || NEAT ||  || align=right | 2.9 km || 
|-id=250 bgcolor=#d6d6d6
| 595250 ||  || — || March 12, 2002 || Palomar || NEAT ||  || align=right | 3.0 km || 
|-id=251 bgcolor=#E9E9E9
| 595251 ||  || — || February 20, 2002 || Kitt Peak || Spacewatch ||  || align=right | 1.3 km || 
|-id=252 bgcolor=#E9E9E9
| 595252 ||  || — || March 13, 2002 || Kitt Peak || Spacewatch ||  || align=right | 1.1 km || 
|-id=253 bgcolor=#d6d6d6
| 595253 ||  || — || March 15, 2002 || Mount Hamilton || Lick Obs. ||  || align=right | 2.0 km || 
|-id=254 bgcolor=#C2FFFF
| 595254 ||  || — || February 14, 2002 || Kitt Peak || Spacewatch || L4 || align=right | 8.2 km || 
|-id=255 bgcolor=#fefefe
| 595255 ||  || — || October 10, 2007 || Catalina || CSS ||  || align=right data-sort-value="0.77" | 770 m || 
|-id=256 bgcolor=#E9E9E9
| 595256 ||  || — || July 30, 2003 || Campo Imperatore || CINEOS ||  || align=right | 1.6 km || 
|-id=257 bgcolor=#C2FFFF
| 595257 ||  || — || November 3, 2010 || Kitt Peak || Spacewatch || L4 || align=right | 7.8 km || 
|-id=258 bgcolor=#d6d6d6
| 595258 ||  || — || April 16, 2013 || Kitt Peak || Spacewatch ||  || align=right | 2.3 km || 
|-id=259 bgcolor=#d6d6d6
| 595259 ||  || — || September 29, 2005 || Mount Lemmon || Mount Lemmon Survey ||  || align=right | 1.9 km || 
|-id=260 bgcolor=#fefefe
| 595260 ||  || — || March 10, 2002 || Kitt Peak || Spacewatch ||  || align=right data-sort-value="0.58" | 580 m || 
|-id=261 bgcolor=#fefefe
| 595261 ||  || — || March 4, 2002 || Kitt Peak || Spacewatch ||  || align=right data-sort-value="0.45" | 450 m || 
|-id=262 bgcolor=#fefefe
| 595262 ||  || — || February 5, 2009 || Kitt Peak || Spacewatch ||  || align=right data-sort-value="0.57" | 570 m || 
|-id=263 bgcolor=#E9E9E9
| 595263 ||  || — || September 9, 2008 || Kitt Peak || Spacewatch ||  || align=right | 1.0 km || 
|-id=264 bgcolor=#E9E9E9
| 595264 ||  || — || August 9, 2013 || Kitt Peak || Spacewatch ||  || align=right | 2.2 km || 
|-id=265 bgcolor=#E9E9E9
| 595265 ||  || — || October 9, 2012 || Mount Lemmon || Mount Lemmon Survey ||  || align=right data-sort-value="0.87" | 870 m || 
|-id=266 bgcolor=#d6d6d6
| 595266 ||  || — || February 17, 2007 || Mount Lemmon || Mount Lemmon Survey ||  || align=right | 1.9 km || 
|-id=267 bgcolor=#E9E9E9
| 595267 ||  || — || June 22, 2015 || Haleakala || Pan-STARRS 2 ||  || align=right data-sort-value="0.58" | 580 m || 
|-id=268 bgcolor=#C2FFFF
| 595268 ||  || — || January 19, 2013 || Kitt Peak || Spacewatch || L4 || align=right | 6.4 km || 
|-id=269 bgcolor=#C2FFFF
| 595269 ||  || — || November 8, 2010 || Mount Lemmon || Mount Lemmon Survey || L4 || align=right | 6.6 km || 
|-id=270 bgcolor=#C2FFFF
| 595270 ||  || — || July 18, 2007 || Mount Lemmon || Mount Lemmon Survey || L4 || align=right | 7.7 km || 
|-id=271 bgcolor=#C2FFFF
| 595271 ||  || — || February 6, 2013 || Mount Lemmon || Mount Lemmon Survey || L4 || align=right | 6.9 km || 
|-id=272 bgcolor=#d6d6d6
| 595272 ||  || — || March 9, 2002 || Kitt Peak || Spacewatch ||  || align=right | 2.1 km || 
|-id=273 bgcolor=#E9E9E9
| 595273 ||  || — || March 18, 2002 || Bohyunsan || Bohyunsan Obs. ||  || align=right | 1.2 km || 
|-id=274 bgcolor=#d6d6d6
| 595274 ||  || — || March 18, 2002 || Kitt Peak || M. W. Buie, D. E. Trilling || 3:2 || align=right | 3.2 km || 
|-id=275 bgcolor=#d6d6d6
| 595275 ||  || — || March 18, 2002 || Kitt Peak || Spacewatch ||  || align=right | 2.3 km || 
|-id=276 bgcolor=#fefefe
| 595276 ||  || — || October 30, 2014 || Mount Lemmon || Mount Lemmon Survey ||  || align=right data-sort-value="0.62" | 620 m || 
|-id=277 bgcolor=#E9E9E9
| 595277 ||  || — || February 17, 2010 || Kitt Peak || Spacewatch ||  || align=right data-sort-value="0.64" | 640 m || 
|-id=278 bgcolor=#fefefe
| 595278 ||  || — || October 30, 2014 || Kitt Peak || Spacewatch ||  || align=right data-sort-value="0.56" | 560 m || 
|-id=279 bgcolor=#C2FFFF
| 595279 ||  || — || September 19, 2008 || Kitt Peak || Spacewatch || L4 || align=right | 6.6 km || 
|-id=280 bgcolor=#d6d6d6
| 595280 ||  || — || April 4, 2002 || Haleakala || AMOS || THB || align=right | 3.2 km || 
|-id=281 bgcolor=#E9E9E9
| 595281 ||  || — || April 9, 2002 || Palomar || NEAT ||  || align=right | 1.4 km || 
|-id=282 bgcolor=#fefefe
| 595282 ||  || — || April 11, 2002 || Palomar || NEAT || H || align=right data-sort-value="0.69" | 690 m || 
|-id=283 bgcolor=#d6d6d6
| 595283 ||  || — || April 6, 2002 || Cerro Tololo || Cerro Tololo Obs. ||  || align=right | 2.0 km || 
|-id=284 bgcolor=#d6d6d6
| 595284 ||  || — || February 8, 2002 || Kitt Peak || R. Millis, M. W. Buie ||  || align=right | 2.5 km || 
|-id=285 bgcolor=#d6d6d6
| 595285 ||  || — || April 7, 2002 || Cerro Tololo || Cerro Tololo Obs. ||  || align=right | 2.2 km || 
|-id=286 bgcolor=#E9E9E9
| 595286 ||  || — || March 12, 2002 || Kitt Peak || Spacewatch ||  || align=right data-sort-value="0.73" | 730 m || 
|-id=287 bgcolor=#d6d6d6
| 595287 ||  || — || April 4, 2002 || Kitt Peak || Spacewatch ||  || align=right | 2.2 km || 
|-id=288 bgcolor=#E9E9E9
| 595288 ||  || — || April 4, 2002 || Haleakala || AMOS ||  || align=right | 1.6 km || 
|-id=289 bgcolor=#E9E9E9
| 595289 ||  || — || April 11, 2002 || Palomar || NEAT ||  || align=right | 1.3 km || 
|-id=290 bgcolor=#fefefe
| 595290 ||  || — || April 12, 2002 || Palomar || NEAT ||  || align=right data-sort-value="0.85" | 850 m || 
|-id=291 bgcolor=#fefefe
| 595291 ||  || — || April 12, 2002 || Kitt Peak || Spacewatch ||  || align=right data-sort-value="0.67" | 670 m || 
|-id=292 bgcolor=#fefefe
| 595292 ||  || — || April 15, 2002 || Palomar || NEAT ||  || align=right data-sort-value="0.76" | 760 m || 
|-id=293 bgcolor=#fefefe
| 595293 ||  || — || April 10, 2002 || Socorro || LINEAR ||  || align=right data-sort-value="0.90" | 900 m || 
|-id=294 bgcolor=#fefefe
| 595294 ||  || — || April 4, 2002 || Palomar || NEAT ||  || align=right data-sort-value="0.68" | 680 m || 
|-id=295 bgcolor=#E9E9E9
| 595295 ||  || — || April 8, 2002 || Palomar || NEAT ||  || align=right | 1.2 km || 
|-id=296 bgcolor=#fefefe
| 595296 ||  || — || February 4, 2009 || Mount Lemmon || Mount Lemmon Survey ||  || align=right data-sort-value="0.62" | 620 m || 
|-id=297 bgcolor=#fefefe
| 595297 ||  || — || March 2, 2009 || Mount Lemmon || Mount Lemmon Survey ||  || align=right data-sort-value="0.67" | 670 m || 
|-id=298 bgcolor=#d6d6d6
| 595298 ||  || — || October 15, 2004 || Kitt Peak || Spacewatch ||  || align=right | 2.4 km || 
|-id=299 bgcolor=#d6d6d6
| 595299 ||  || — || December 4, 2010 || Mount Lemmon || Mount Lemmon Survey ||  || align=right | 2.6 km || 
|-id=300 bgcolor=#E9E9E9
| 595300 ||  || — || September 3, 2007 || Mount Lemmon || Mount Lemmon Survey ||  || align=right | 1.6 km || 
|}

595301–595400 

|-bgcolor=#E9E9E9
| 595301 ||  || — || October 1, 2003 || Kitt Peak || Spacewatch ||  || align=right | 1.5 km || 
|-id=302 bgcolor=#fefefe
| 595302 ||  || — || December 1, 2010 || Mount Lemmon || Mount Lemmon Survey ||  || align=right data-sort-value="0.88" | 880 m || 
|-id=303 bgcolor=#E9E9E9
| 595303 ||  || — || November 3, 2008 || Mount Lemmon || Mount Lemmon Survey || MAR || align=right | 1.1 km || 
|-id=304 bgcolor=#fefefe
| 595304 ||  || — || October 7, 2010 || Kitt Peak || Spacewatch ||  || align=right data-sort-value="0.74" | 740 m || 
|-id=305 bgcolor=#E9E9E9
| 595305 ||  || — || October 20, 2012 || Haleakala || Pan-STARRS ||  || align=right | 1.7 km || 
|-id=306 bgcolor=#d6d6d6
| 595306 ||  || — || October 27, 2005 || Kitt Peak || Spacewatch ||  || align=right | 2.4 km || 
|-id=307 bgcolor=#fefefe
| 595307 ||  || — || April 4, 2002 || Kitt Peak || Spacewatch ||  || align=right data-sort-value="0.60" | 600 m || 
|-id=308 bgcolor=#fefefe
| 595308 ||  || — || April 9, 2002 || Kitt Peak || Spacewatch ||  || align=right data-sort-value="0.63" | 630 m || 
|-id=309 bgcolor=#E9E9E9
| 595309 ||  || — || December 2, 2008 || Mount Lemmon || Mount Lemmon Survey ||  || align=right | 1.3 km || 
|-id=310 bgcolor=#E9E9E9
| 595310 ||  || — || April 8, 2002 || Kitt Peak || Spacewatch ||  || align=right | 1.5 km || 
|-id=311 bgcolor=#E9E9E9
| 595311 ||  || — || July 27, 2011 || Siding Spring || SSS ||  || align=right | 1.1 km || 
|-id=312 bgcolor=#E9E9E9
| 595312 ||  || — || April 10, 2002 || Socorro || LINEAR ||  || align=right | 1.3 km || 
|-id=313 bgcolor=#E9E9E9
| 595313 ||  || — || April 21, 2002 || Palomar || NEAT ||  || align=right | 1.6 km || 
|-id=314 bgcolor=#E9E9E9
| 595314 ||  || — || March 13, 2014 || Mount Lemmon || Mount Lemmon Survey ||  || align=right | 1.1 km || 
|-id=315 bgcolor=#E9E9E9
| 595315 ||  || — || June 15, 2015 || Haleakala || Pan-STARRS ||  || align=right | 1.2 km || 
|-id=316 bgcolor=#fefefe
| 595316 ||  || — || April 10, 2002 || Socorro || LINEAR ||  || align=right data-sort-value="0.91" | 910 m || 
|-id=317 bgcolor=#fefefe
| 595317 ||  || — || April 12, 2002 || Palomar || NEAT || H || align=right data-sort-value="0.75" | 750 m || 
|-id=318 bgcolor=#E9E9E9
| 595318 ||  || — || May 4, 2002 || Palomar || NEAT ||  || align=right | 1.6 km || 
|-id=319 bgcolor=#E9E9E9
| 595319 ||  || — || April 14, 2002 || Socorro || LINEAR ||  || align=right | 1.5 km || 
|-id=320 bgcolor=#E9E9E9
| 595320 ||  || — || May 13, 2002 || Palomar || NEAT ||  || align=right | 1.9 km || 
|-id=321 bgcolor=#d6d6d6
| 595321 ||  || — || September 29, 2009 || Mount Lemmon || Mount Lemmon Survey ||  || align=right | 2.9 km || 
|-id=322 bgcolor=#fefefe
| 595322 ||  || — || April 24, 2009 || Mount Lemmon || Mount Lemmon Survey ||  || align=right data-sort-value="0.61" | 610 m || 
|-id=323 bgcolor=#d6d6d6
| 595323 ||  || — || October 16, 2009 || Catalina || CSS ||  || align=right | 4.0 km || 
|-id=324 bgcolor=#fefefe
| 595324 ||  || — || January 16, 2005 || Mauna Kea || Mauna Kea Obs. ||  || align=right data-sort-value="0.81" | 810 m || 
|-id=325 bgcolor=#E9E9E9
| 595325 ||  || — || January 4, 2013 || Mount Lemmon || Mount Lemmon Survey ||  || align=right | 1.9 km || 
|-id=326 bgcolor=#E9E9E9
| 595326 ||  || — || December 3, 2004 || Kitt Peak || Spacewatch ||  || align=right | 1.8 km || 
|-id=327 bgcolor=#d6d6d6
| 595327 ||  || — || November 24, 2011 || Haleakala || Pan-STARRS ||  || align=right | 2.4 km || 
|-id=328 bgcolor=#d6d6d6
| 595328 ||  || — || May 14, 2002 || Kitt Peak || Spacewatch ||  || align=right | 2.7 km || 
|-id=329 bgcolor=#E9E9E9
| 595329 ||  || — || May 12, 2002 || Palomar || NEAT ||  || align=right | 1.1 km || 
|-id=330 bgcolor=#fefefe
| 595330 ||  || — || November 17, 2014 || Haleakala || Pan-STARRS ||  || align=right data-sort-value="0.66" | 660 m || 
|-id=331 bgcolor=#E9E9E9
| 595331 ||  || — || December 23, 2017 || Haleakala || Pan-STARRS ||  || align=right | 1.0 km || 
|-id=332 bgcolor=#E9E9E9
| 595332 ||  || — || April 19, 2006 || Palomar || NEAT ||  || align=right | 2.8 km || 
|-id=333 bgcolor=#d6d6d6
| 595333 ||  || — || September 26, 2009 || Catalina || CSS ||  || align=right | 4.7 km || 
|-id=334 bgcolor=#fefefe
| 595334 ||  || — || August 19, 2006 || Anderson Mesa || LONEOS ||  || align=right data-sort-value="0.95" | 950 m || 
|-id=335 bgcolor=#fefefe
| 595335 ||  || — || February 22, 2009 || Kitt Peak || Spacewatch ||  || align=right data-sort-value="0.69" | 690 m || 
|-id=336 bgcolor=#fefefe
| 595336 ||  || — || March 10, 2005 || Catalina || CSS ||  || align=right data-sort-value="0.76" | 760 m || 
|-id=337 bgcolor=#d6d6d6
| 595337 ||  || — || July 25, 2014 || Haleakala || Pan-STARRS ||  || align=right | 2.1 km || 
|-id=338 bgcolor=#E9E9E9
| 595338 ||  || — || July 20, 2002 || Palomar || NEAT || JUN || align=right | 1.1 km || 
|-id=339 bgcolor=#fefefe
| 595339 ||  || — || May 14, 2008 || Mount Lemmon || Mount Lemmon Survey ||  || align=right data-sort-value="0.62" | 620 m || 
|-id=340 bgcolor=#E9E9E9
| 595340 ||  || — || November 1, 2007 || Kitt Peak || Spacewatch ||  || align=right | 1.4 km || 
|-id=341 bgcolor=#fefefe
| 595341 ||  || — || April 20, 2009 || Kitt Peak || Spacewatch ||  || align=right data-sort-value="0.81" | 810 m || 
|-id=342 bgcolor=#fefefe
| 595342 ||  || — || November 1, 2010 || Kitt Peak || Spacewatch ||  || align=right data-sort-value="0.80" | 800 m || 
|-id=343 bgcolor=#d6d6d6
| 595343 ||  || — || April 6, 2013 || Catalina || CSS || Tj (2.99) || align=right | 3.1 km || 
|-id=344 bgcolor=#E9E9E9
| 595344 ||  || — || July 8, 2002 || Palomar || NEAT ||  || align=right | 1.0 km || 
|-id=345 bgcolor=#E9E9E9
| 595345 ||  || — || March 8, 2005 || Mount Lemmon || Mount Lemmon Survey ||  || align=right | 1.3 km || 
|-id=346 bgcolor=#E9E9E9
| 595346 ||  || — || September 10, 2007 || Mount Lemmon || Mount Lemmon Survey ||  || align=right | 1.7 km || 
|-id=347 bgcolor=#E9E9E9
| 595347 ||  || — || August 23, 2007 || Kitt Peak || Spacewatch ||  || align=right | 2.1 km || 
|-id=348 bgcolor=#E9E9E9
| 595348 ||  || — || November 5, 2007 || Kitt Peak || Spacewatch ||  || align=right | 1.4 km || 
|-id=349 bgcolor=#E9E9E9
| 595349 ||  || — || April 10, 2014 || Haleakala || Pan-STARRS ||  || align=right | 1.7 km || 
|-id=350 bgcolor=#fefefe
| 595350 ||  || — || August 6, 2002 || Palomar || NEAT || H || align=right data-sort-value="0.70" | 700 m || 
|-id=351 bgcolor=#E9E9E9
| 595351 ||  || — || July 21, 2002 || Palomar || NEAT ||  || align=right | 1.2 km || 
|-id=352 bgcolor=#E9E9E9
| 595352 ||  || — || February 18, 2010 || Kitt Peak || Spacewatch ||  || align=right | 2.6 km || 
|-id=353 bgcolor=#E9E9E9
| 595353 ||  || — || May 23, 2006 || Catalina || CSS || JUN || align=right data-sort-value="0.91" | 910 m || 
|-id=354 bgcolor=#d6d6d6
| 595354 ||  || — || August 4, 2002 || Palomar || NEAT ||  || align=right | 3.4 km || 
|-id=355 bgcolor=#E9E9E9
| 595355 ||  || — || July 20, 2002 || Palomar || NEAT ||  || align=right | 2.2 km || 
|-id=356 bgcolor=#E9E9E9
| 595356 ||  || — || August 6, 2002 || Palomar || NEAT ||  || align=right data-sort-value="0.80" | 800 m || 
|-id=357 bgcolor=#FA8072
| 595357 ||  || — || August 12, 2002 || Anderson Mesa || LONEOS || H || align=right data-sort-value="0.79" | 790 m || 
|-id=358 bgcolor=#E9E9E9
| 595358 ||  || — || July 9, 2002 || Palomar || NEAT ||  || align=right | 1.3 km || 
|-id=359 bgcolor=#d6d6d6
| 595359 ||  || — || July 12, 2002 || Palomar || NEAT ||  || align=right | 3.4 km || 
|-id=360 bgcolor=#E9E9E9
| 595360 ||  || — || August 4, 2002 || Palomar || NEAT || HNS || align=right | 1.5 km || 
|-id=361 bgcolor=#fefefe
| 595361 ||  || — || August 14, 2002 || Socorro || LINEAR ||  || align=right | 1.2 km || 
|-id=362 bgcolor=#fefefe
| 595362 ||  || — || August 11, 2002 || Palomar || NEAT || V || align=right data-sort-value="0.51" | 510 m || 
|-id=363 bgcolor=#E9E9E9
| 595363 ||  || — || August 8, 2002 || Palomar || NEAT || DOR || align=right | 1.9 km || 
|-id=364 bgcolor=#fefefe
| 595364 ||  || — || January 24, 2012 || Haleakala || Pan-STARRS ||  || align=right | 1.1 km || 
|-id=365 bgcolor=#fefefe
| 595365 ||  || — || May 15, 2005 || Palomar || NEAT ||  || align=right data-sort-value="0.75" | 750 m || 
|-id=366 bgcolor=#E9E9E9
| 595366 ||  || — || August 4, 2002 || Palomar || NEAT ||  || align=right | 2.1 km || 
|-id=367 bgcolor=#fefefe
| 595367 ||  || — || August 15, 2002 || Palomar || NEAT ||  || align=right data-sort-value="0.69" | 690 m || 
|-id=368 bgcolor=#d6d6d6
| 595368 ||  || — || May 11, 2007 || Kitt Peak || Spacewatch ||  || align=right | 2.9 km || 
|-id=369 bgcolor=#E9E9E9
| 595369 ||  || — || September 12, 2007 || Mount Lemmon || Mount Lemmon Survey ||  || align=right | 1.5 km || 
|-id=370 bgcolor=#E9E9E9
| 595370 ||  || — || September 10, 2007 || Kitt Peak || Spacewatch ||  || align=right | 1.7 km || 
|-id=371 bgcolor=#E9E9E9
| 595371 ||  || — || October 12, 2007 || Mount Lemmon || Mount Lemmon Survey ||  || align=right | 2.1 km || 
|-id=372 bgcolor=#E9E9E9
| 595372 ||  || — || September 13, 2007 || Catalina || CSS ||  || align=right | 2.9 km || 
|-id=373 bgcolor=#E9E9E9
| 595373 ||  || — || December 1, 2003 || Kitt Peak || Spacewatch ||  || align=right | 1.6 km || 
|-id=374 bgcolor=#fefefe
| 595374 ||  || — || August 1, 2016 || Haleakala || Pan-STARRS ||  || align=right data-sort-value="0.76" | 760 m || 
|-id=375 bgcolor=#d6d6d6
| 595375 ||  || — || August 28, 2002 || Palomar || NEAT ||  || align=right | 3.2 km || 
|-id=376 bgcolor=#fefefe
| 595376 ||  || — || September 10, 2002 || Haleakala || AMOS ||  || align=right data-sort-value="0.66" | 660 m || 
|-id=377 bgcolor=#fefefe
| 595377 ||  || — || May 10, 2005 || Kitt Peak || Spacewatch ||  || align=right data-sort-value="0.62" | 620 m || 
|-id=378 bgcolor=#fefefe
| 595378 ||  || — || April 10, 2005 || Kitt Peak || Spacewatch ||  || align=right data-sort-value="0.81" | 810 m || 
|-id=379 bgcolor=#E9E9E9
| 595379 ||  || — || August 16, 2002 || Palomar || NEAT ||  || align=right | 1.7 km || 
|-id=380 bgcolor=#E9E9E9
| 595380 ||  || — || February 9, 2005 || Mount Lemmon || Mount Lemmon Survey ||  || align=right | 2.0 km || 
|-id=381 bgcolor=#fefefe
| 595381 ||  || — || September 17, 2006 || Kitt Peak || Spacewatch ||  || align=right data-sort-value="0.51" | 510 m || 
|-id=382 bgcolor=#fefefe
| 595382 ||  || — || August 16, 2002 || Palomar || NEAT ||  || align=right data-sort-value="0.81" | 810 m || 
|-id=383 bgcolor=#fefefe
| 595383 ||  || — || April 14, 2005 || Kitt Peak || Spacewatch ||  || align=right data-sort-value="0.72" | 720 m || 
|-id=384 bgcolor=#d6d6d6
| 595384 ||  || — || August 18, 2002 || Palomar || NEAT ||  || align=right | 2.6 km || 
|-id=385 bgcolor=#E9E9E9
| 595385 ||  || — || July 22, 2002 || Palomar || NEAT || ADE || align=right | 1.3 km || 
|-id=386 bgcolor=#E9E9E9
| 595386 ||  || — || January 20, 2009 || Mount Lemmon || Mount Lemmon Survey ||  || align=right | 2.3 km || 
|-id=387 bgcolor=#E9E9E9
| 595387 ||  || — || August 29, 2002 || Kitt Peak || Spacewatch ||  || align=right data-sort-value="0.85" | 850 m || 
|-id=388 bgcolor=#fefefe
| 595388 ||  || — || August 20, 2002 || Palomar || NEAT ||  || align=right data-sort-value="0.83" | 830 m || 
|-id=389 bgcolor=#fefefe
| 595389 ||  || — || March 18, 2009 || Siding Spring || SSS || H || align=right data-sort-value="0.76" | 760 m || 
|-id=390 bgcolor=#fefefe
| 595390 ||  || — || May 25, 2009 || Kitt Peak || Spacewatch || NYS || align=right data-sort-value="0.49" | 490 m || 
|-id=391 bgcolor=#fefefe
| 595391 ||  || — || September 1, 2002 || Haleakala || AMOS || H || align=right data-sort-value="0.62" | 620 m || 
|-id=392 bgcolor=#d6d6d6
| 595392 ||  || — || September 9, 2008 || Mount Lemmon || Mount Lemmon Survey ||  || align=right | 2.9 km || 
|-id=393 bgcolor=#fefefe
| 595393 ||  || — || April 30, 2011 || Mount Lemmon || Mount Lemmon Survey ||  || align=right data-sort-value="0.47" | 470 m || 
|-id=394 bgcolor=#E9E9E9
| 595394 ||  || — || October 22, 1998 || Kitt Peak || Spacewatch ||  || align=right | 2.0 km || 
|-id=395 bgcolor=#E9E9E9
| 595395 ||  || — || August 20, 2011 || Haleakala || Pan-STARRS ||  || align=right | 1.3 km || 
|-id=396 bgcolor=#E9E9E9
| 595396 ||  || — || July 9, 2011 || Haleakala || Pan-STARRS ||  || align=right | 1.9 km || 
|-id=397 bgcolor=#E9E9E9
| 595397 ||  || — || October 8, 2007 || Mount Lemmon || Mount Lemmon Survey ||  || align=right | 1.9 km || 
|-id=398 bgcolor=#fefefe
| 595398 ||  || — || March 12, 2005 || Kitt Peak || Spacewatch || NYS || align=right data-sort-value="0.62" | 620 m || 
|-id=399 bgcolor=#E9E9E9
| 595399 ||  || — || February 3, 2009 || Kitt Peak || Spacewatch ||  || align=right | 2.3 km || 
|-id=400 bgcolor=#fefefe
| 595400 ||  || — || August 17, 2009 || La Sagra || OAM Obs. || V || align=right data-sort-value="0.61" | 610 m || 
|}

595401–595500 

|-bgcolor=#fefefe
| 595401 ||  || — || August 19, 2002 || Palomar || NEAT ||  || align=right data-sort-value="0.58" | 580 m || 
|-id=402 bgcolor=#d6d6d6
| 595402 ||  || — || October 25, 2008 || Catalina || CSS ||  || align=right | 2.9 km || 
|-id=403 bgcolor=#E9E9E9
| 595403 ||  || — || October 14, 2007 || Catalina || CSS ||  || align=right | 2.0 km || 
|-id=404 bgcolor=#fefefe
| 595404 ||  || — || January 19, 2012 || Haleakala || Pan-STARRS ||  || align=right data-sort-value="0.85" | 850 m || 
|-id=405 bgcolor=#d6d6d6
| 595405 ||  || — || April 22, 2012 || Kitt Peak || Spacewatch ||  || align=right | 2.4 km || 
|-id=406 bgcolor=#fefefe
| 595406 ||  || — || October 19, 2006 || Kitt Peak || Spacewatch ||  || align=right data-sort-value="0.76" | 760 m || 
|-id=407 bgcolor=#fefefe
| 595407 ||  || — || November 1, 2013 || Mount Lemmon || Mount Lemmon Survey ||  || align=right data-sort-value="0.61" | 610 m || 
|-id=408 bgcolor=#E9E9E9
| 595408 ||  || — || October 10, 2007 || Kitt Peak || Spacewatch ||  || align=right | 2.0 km || 
|-id=409 bgcolor=#E9E9E9
| 595409 ||  || — || January 1, 2009 || Mount Lemmon || Mount Lemmon Survey ||  || align=right | 1.7 km || 
|-id=410 bgcolor=#E9E9E9
| 595410 ||  || — || September 7, 2002 || Ondrejov || P. Pravec, P. Kušnirák ||  || align=right | 1.4 km || 
|-id=411 bgcolor=#fefefe
| 595411 ||  || — || September 8, 2002 || Haleakala || AMOS ||  || align=right data-sort-value="0.98" | 980 m || 
|-id=412 bgcolor=#fefefe
| 595412 ||  || — || September 9, 2002 || Palomar || NEAT || H || align=right data-sort-value="0.65" | 650 m || 
|-id=413 bgcolor=#E9E9E9
| 595413 ||  || — || September 12, 2002 || Palomar || NEAT || DOR || align=right | 1.8 km || 
|-id=414 bgcolor=#fefefe
| 595414 ||  || — || September 13, 2002 || Palomar || NEAT ||  || align=right data-sort-value="0.90" | 900 m || 
|-id=415 bgcolor=#d6d6d6
| 595415 ||  || — || September 13, 2002 || Palomar || NEAT || 3:2 || align=right | 4.2 km || 
|-id=416 bgcolor=#fefefe
| 595416 ||  || — || August 17, 2002 || Haleakala || AMOS ||  || align=right | 1.2 km || 
|-id=417 bgcolor=#fefefe
| 595417 ||  || — || November 17, 1995 || Kitt Peak || Spacewatch ||  || align=right data-sort-value="0.62" | 620 m || 
|-id=418 bgcolor=#E9E9E9
| 595418 ||  || — || September 9, 2002 || Haleakala || AMOS || JUN || align=right | 1.0 km || 
|-id=419 bgcolor=#fefefe
| 595419 ||  || — || September 13, 2002 || Haleakala || AMOS ||  || align=right data-sort-value="0.71" | 710 m || 
|-id=420 bgcolor=#E9E9E9
| 595420 ||  || — || September 13, 2002 || Haleakala || AMOS ||  || align=right | 1.5 km || 
|-id=421 bgcolor=#E9E9E9
| 595421 ||  || — || September 5, 2002 || Socorro || LINEAR ||  || align=right | 2.4 km || 
|-id=422 bgcolor=#E9E9E9
| 595422 ||  || — || September 6, 2002 || Socorro || LINEAR ||  || align=right | 1.3 km || 
|-id=423 bgcolor=#E9E9E9
| 595423 ||  || — || August 12, 2002 || Socorro || LINEAR ||  || align=right | 1.2 km || 
|-id=424 bgcolor=#fefefe
| 595424 ||  || — || July 23, 2002 || Palomar || NEAT ||  || align=right data-sort-value="0.62" | 620 m || 
|-id=425 bgcolor=#d6d6d6
| 595425 ||  || — || September 28, 2002 || Haleakala || AMOS ||  || align=right | 2.3 km || 
|-id=426 bgcolor=#E9E9E9
| 595426 ||  || — || March 8, 2005 || Mount Lemmon || Mount Lemmon Survey ||  || align=right | 1.9 km || 
|-id=427 bgcolor=#E9E9E9
| 595427 ||  || — || November 13, 2007 || Mount Lemmon || Mount Lemmon Survey ||  || align=right | 2.0 km || 
|-id=428 bgcolor=#E9E9E9
| 595428 ||  || — || November 2, 2007 || Kitt Peak || Spacewatch || HOF || align=right | 2.4 km || 
|-id=429 bgcolor=#fefefe
| 595429 ||  || — || August 12, 2002 || Cerro Tololo || M. W. Buie, S. D. Kern ||  || align=right data-sort-value="0.61" | 610 m || 
|-id=430 bgcolor=#E9E9E9
| 595430 ||  || — || March 15, 2010 || Kitt Peak || Spacewatch ||  || align=right | 2.2 km || 
|-id=431 bgcolor=#fefefe
| 595431 ||  || — || March 27, 2009 || Siding Spring || SSS || H || align=right data-sort-value="0.68" | 680 m || 
|-id=432 bgcolor=#d6d6d6
| 595432 ||  || — || November 1, 2008 || Mount Lemmon || Mount Lemmon Survey ||  || align=right | 2.5 km || 
|-id=433 bgcolor=#E9E9E9
| 595433 ||  || — || July 5, 2011 || Haleakala || Pan-STARRS ||  || align=right | 1.5 km || 
|-id=434 bgcolor=#E9E9E9
| 595434 ||  || — || October 18, 2011 || Catalina || CSS ||  || align=right | 1.8 km || 
|-id=435 bgcolor=#E9E9E9
| 595435 ||  || — || September 15, 2002 || Haleakala || AMOS ||  || align=right | 1.2 km || 
|-id=436 bgcolor=#fefefe
| 595436 ||  || — || March 11, 2008 || Mount Lemmon || Mount Lemmon Survey ||  || align=right data-sort-value="0.72" | 720 m || 
|-id=437 bgcolor=#E9E9E9
| 595437 ||  || — || February 9, 2005 || Kitt Peak || Spacewatch ||  || align=right | 1.9 km || 
|-id=438 bgcolor=#E9E9E9
| 595438 ||  || — || September 20, 2011 || Kitt Peak || Spacewatch ||  || align=right | 1.6 km || 
|-id=439 bgcolor=#fefefe
| 595439 ||  || — || September 28, 2002 || Haleakala || AMOS ||  || align=right data-sort-value="0.97" | 970 m || 
|-id=440 bgcolor=#fefefe
| 595440 ||  || — || September 29, 2002 || Haleakala || AMOS ||  || align=right data-sort-value="0.72" | 720 m || 
|-id=441 bgcolor=#fefefe
| 595441 ||  || — || September 5, 2002 || Haleakala || AMOS || H || align=right data-sort-value="0.68" | 680 m || 
|-id=442 bgcolor=#d6d6d6
| 595442 ||  || — || September 16, 2002 || Palomar || NEAT ||  || align=right | 2.7 km || 
|-id=443 bgcolor=#E9E9E9
| 595443 ||  || — || September 19, 2002 || Palomar || NEAT ||  || align=right | 1.2 km || 
|-id=444 bgcolor=#E9E9E9
| 595444 ||  || — || October 11, 2007 || Kitt Peak || Spacewatch ||  || align=right | 2.1 km || 
|-id=445 bgcolor=#fefefe
| 595445 ||  || — || October 2, 2002 || Socorro || LINEAR ||  || align=right data-sort-value="0.53" | 530 m || 
|-id=446 bgcolor=#fefefe
| 595446 ||  || — || October 4, 2002 || Socorro || LINEAR || H || align=right data-sort-value="0.73" | 730 m || 
|-id=447 bgcolor=#fefefe
| 595447 ||  || — || October 3, 2002 || Palomar || NEAT ||  || align=right | 1.1 km || 
|-id=448 bgcolor=#fefefe
| 595448 ||  || — || October 4, 2002 || Socorro || LINEAR ||  || align=right data-sort-value="0.67" | 670 m || 
|-id=449 bgcolor=#E9E9E9
| 595449 ||  || — || October 3, 2002 || Palomar || NEAT || JUN || align=right data-sort-value="0.97" | 970 m || 
|-id=450 bgcolor=#E9E9E9
| 595450 ||  || — || October 5, 2002 || Palomar || NEAT ||  || align=right | 1.9 km || 
|-id=451 bgcolor=#fefefe
| 595451 ||  || — || October 5, 2002 || Palomar || NEAT ||  || align=right data-sort-value="0.95" | 950 m || 
|-id=452 bgcolor=#E9E9E9
| 595452 ||  || — || October 5, 2002 || Palomar || NEAT ||  || align=right | 3.0 km || 
|-id=453 bgcolor=#fefefe
| 595453 ||  || — || October 4, 2002 || Socorro || LINEAR ||  || align=right data-sort-value="0.89" | 890 m || 
|-id=454 bgcolor=#fefefe
| 595454 ||  || — || October 2, 2002 || Socorro || LINEAR ||  || align=right data-sort-value="0.96" | 960 m || 
|-id=455 bgcolor=#E9E9E9
| 595455 ||  || — || October 3, 2002 || Palomar || NEAT ||  || align=right | 2.4 km || 
|-id=456 bgcolor=#E9E9E9
| 595456 ||  || — || April 2, 2005 || Mount Lemmon || Mount Lemmon Survey ||  || align=right | 2.0 km || 
|-id=457 bgcolor=#fefefe
| 595457 ||  || — || March 15, 2004 || Kitt Peak || Spacewatch ||  || align=right | 1.0 km || 
|-id=458 bgcolor=#E9E9E9
| 595458 ||  || — || October 5, 2002 || Palomar || NEAT ||  || align=right | 1.4 km || 
|-id=459 bgcolor=#fefefe
| 595459 ||  || — || November 28, 2014 || Mount Lemmon || Mount Lemmon Survey ||  || align=right | 1.5 km || 
|-id=460 bgcolor=#d6d6d6
| 595460 ||  || — || September 18, 2007 || Kitt Peak || Spacewatch ||  || align=right | 2.5 km || 
|-id=461 bgcolor=#E9E9E9
| 595461 ||  || — || March 11, 2008 || Kitt Peak || Spacewatch ||  || align=right data-sort-value="0.63" | 630 m || 
|-id=462 bgcolor=#E9E9E9
| 595462 ||  || — || September 24, 2011 || Mount Lemmon || Mount Lemmon Survey ||  || align=right | 1.6 km || 
|-id=463 bgcolor=#E9E9E9
| 595463 ||  || — || October 4, 2002 || Campo Imperatore || CINEOS ||  || align=right | 2.0 km || 
|-id=464 bgcolor=#E9E9E9
| 595464 ||  || — || October 28, 2002 || Nogales || P. R. Holvorcem, M. Schwartz ||  || align=right | 1.4 km || 
|-id=465 bgcolor=#fefefe
| 595465 ||  || — || October 15, 2002 || Palomar || NEAT ||  || align=right | 1.1 km || 
|-id=466 bgcolor=#E9E9E9
| 595466 ||  || — || October 31, 2002 || Palomar || NEAT ||  || align=right | 1.9 km || 
|-id=467 bgcolor=#FA8072
| 595467 ||  || — || October 31, 2002 || Socorro || LINEAR ||  || align=right data-sort-value="0.48" | 480 m || 
|-id=468 bgcolor=#d6d6d6
| 595468 ||  || — || October 31, 2002 || Apache Point || SDSS Collaboration ||  || align=right | 2.4 km || 
|-id=469 bgcolor=#fefefe
| 595469 ||  || — || August 12, 2007 || Siding Spring || SSS || H || align=right data-sort-value="0.90" | 900 m || 
|-id=470 bgcolor=#fefefe
| 595470 ||  || — || September 15, 2013 || Haleakala || Pan-STARRS ||  || align=right data-sort-value="0.70" | 700 m || 
|-id=471 bgcolor=#fefefe
| 595471 ||  || — || November 5, 2002 || Anderson Mesa || LONEOS ||  || align=right | 1.0 km || 
|-id=472 bgcolor=#d6d6d6
| 595472 ||  || — || November 12, 2002 || Socorro || LINEAR ||  || align=right | 1.6 km || 
|-id=473 bgcolor=#E9E9E9
| 595473 ||  || — || April 14, 2005 || Kitt Peak || Spacewatch ||  || align=right | 2.7 km || 
|-id=474 bgcolor=#E9E9E9
| 595474 ||  || — || May 10, 2005 || Mount Lemmon || Mount Lemmon Survey ||  || align=right | 2.7 km || 
|-id=475 bgcolor=#fefefe
| 595475 ||  || — || July 29, 2005 || Palomar || NEAT ||  || align=right data-sort-value="0.75" | 750 m || 
|-id=476 bgcolor=#fefefe
| 595476 ||  || — || August 11, 2012 || Siding Spring || SSS ||  || align=right data-sort-value="0.59" | 590 m || 
|-id=477 bgcolor=#d6d6d6
| 595477 ||  || — || September 18, 2011 || Mount Lemmon || Mount Lemmon Survey ||  || align=right | 1.5 km || 
|-id=478 bgcolor=#E9E9E9
| 595478 ||  || — || March 1, 2009 || Mount Lemmon || Mount Lemmon Survey ||  || align=right | 1.7 km || 
|-id=479 bgcolor=#d6d6d6
| 595479 ||  || — || November 13, 2002 || Palomar || NEAT || KOR || align=right | 1.4 km || 
|-id=480 bgcolor=#fefefe
| 595480 ||  || — || October 30, 2002 || Palomar || NEAT ||  || align=right data-sort-value="0.70" | 700 m || 
|-id=481 bgcolor=#FA8072
| 595481 ||  || — || October 14, 2009 || Catalina || CSS ||  || align=right data-sort-value="0.76" | 760 m || 
|-id=482 bgcolor=#fefefe
| 595482 ||  || — || November 13, 2002 || Palomar || NEAT ||  || align=right data-sort-value="0.88" | 880 m || 
|-id=483 bgcolor=#fefefe
| 595483 ||  || — || May 8, 2008 || Kitt Peak || Spacewatch ||  || align=right data-sort-value="0.82" | 820 m || 
|-id=484 bgcolor=#fefefe
| 595484 ||  || — || March 16, 2007 || Mount Lemmon || Mount Lemmon Survey ||  || align=right data-sort-value="0.64" | 640 m || 
|-id=485 bgcolor=#d6d6d6
| 595485 ||  || — || August 2, 2016 || Haleakala || Pan-STARRS ||  || align=right | 1.9 km || 
|-id=486 bgcolor=#d6d6d6
| 595486 ||  || — || December 9, 2002 || Uccle || T. Pauwels ||  || align=right | 3.4 km || 
|-id=487 bgcolor=#d6d6d6
| 595487 ||  || — || September 20, 2011 || Mount Lemmon || Mount Lemmon Survey ||  || align=right | 1.8 km || 
|-id=488 bgcolor=#E9E9E9
| 595488 ||  || — || December 5, 2007 || Mount Lemmon || Mount Lemmon Survey ||  || align=right | 1.9 km || 
|-id=489 bgcolor=#E9E9E9
| 595489 ||  || — || December 31, 2002 || Socorro || LINEAR ||  || align=right | 1.1 km || 
|-id=490 bgcolor=#fefefe
| 595490 ||  || — || January 3, 2003 || Kitt Peak || Spacewatch ||  || align=right data-sort-value="0.71" | 710 m || 
|-id=491 bgcolor=#C2FFFF
| 595491 ||  || — || January 1, 2003 || La Silla || La Silla Obs. || L5 || align=right | 5.8 km || 
|-id=492 bgcolor=#d6d6d6
| 595492 ||  || — || January 24, 2003 || La Silla || A. Boattini, O. R. Hainaut ||  || align=right | 1.9 km || 
|-id=493 bgcolor=#d6d6d6
| 595493 ||  || — || January 24, 2003 || La Silla || A. Boattini, O. R. Hainaut ||  || align=right | 2.8 km || 
|-id=494 bgcolor=#d6d6d6
| 595494 ||  || — || January 26, 2003 || Anderson Mesa || LONEOS || Tj (2.99) || align=right | 3.6 km || 
|-id=495 bgcolor=#d6d6d6
| 595495 ||  || — || January 28, 2003 || Socorro || LINEAR ||  || align=right | 4.1 km || 
|-id=496 bgcolor=#E9E9E9
| 595496 ||  || — || January 27, 2003 || Socorro || LINEAR ||  || align=right | 2.3 km || 
|-id=497 bgcolor=#d6d6d6
| 595497 ||  || — || January 15, 2003 || Palomar || NEAT ||  || align=right | 2.5 km || 
|-id=498 bgcolor=#d6d6d6
| 595498 ||  || — || January 16, 2008 || Mount Lemmon || Mount Lemmon Survey ||  || align=right | 2.4 km || 
|-id=499 bgcolor=#d6d6d6
| 595499 ||  || — || March 2, 2009 || Mount Lemmon || Mount Lemmon Survey ||  || align=right | 2.1 km || 
|-id=500 bgcolor=#fefefe
| 595500 ||  || — || March 5, 2011 || Mount Lemmon || Mount Lemmon Survey ||  || align=right data-sort-value="0.77" | 770 m || 
|}

595501–595600 

|-bgcolor=#d6d6d6
| 595501 ||  || — || March 2, 2009 || Kitt Peak || Spacewatch ||  || align=right | 2.4 km || 
|-id=502 bgcolor=#d6d6d6
| 595502 ||  || — || July 8, 2016 || Haleakala || Pan-STARRS ||  || align=right | 2.4 km || 
|-id=503 bgcolor=#E9E9E9
| 595503 ||  || — || December 10, 2006 || Kitt Peak || Spacewatch ||  || align=right data-sort-value="0.88" | 880 m || 
|-id=504 bgcolor=#d6d6d6
| 595504 ||  || — || February 1, 2008 || Kitt Peak || Spacewatch ||  || align=right | 1.6 km || 
|-id=505 bgcolor=#d6d6d6
| 595505 ||  || — || April 25, 2015 || Haleakala || Pan-STARRS ||  || align=right | 2.0 km || 
|-id=506 bgcolor=#E9E9E9
| 595506 ||  || — || December 9, 2010 || Mount Lemmon || Mount Lemmon Survey ||  || align=right | 1.0 km || 
|-id=507 bgcolor=#fefefe
| 595507 ||  || — || January 27, 2003 || Kitt Peak || Spacewatch || H || align=right data-sort-value="0.83" | 830 m || 
|-id=508 bgcolor=#d6d6d6
| 595508 ||  || — || February 7, 2003 || La Silla ||  ||  || align=right | 2.6 km || 
|-id=509 bgcolor=#d6d6d6
| 595509 ||  || — || April 4, 2014 || Kitt Peak || Spacewatch ||  || align=right | 2.1 km || 
|-id=510 bgcolor=#d6d6d6
| 595510 ||  || — || May 21, 2015 || Haleakala || Pan-STARRS ||  || align=right | 2.3 km || 
|-id=511 bgcolor=#d6d6d6
| 595511 ||  || — || March 10, 2003 || Palomar || NEAT ||  || align=right | 3.0 km || 
|-id=512 bgcolor=#d6d6d6
| 595512 ||  || — || March 6, 2003 || Anderson Mesa || LONEOS ||  || align=right | 2.2 km || 
|-id=513 bgcolor=#E9E9E9
| 595513 ||  || — || March 23, 2003 || Kitt Peak || Spacewatch ||  || align=right data-sort-value="0.87" | 870 m || 
|-id=514 bgcolor=#E9E9E9
| 595514 ||  || — || March 11, 2003 || Kitt Peak || Spacewatch ||  || align=right data-sort-value="0.62" | 620 m || 
|-id=515 bgcolor=#d6d6d6
| 595515 ||  || — || March 26, 2003 || Kitt Peak || Spacewatch ||  || align=right | 3.2 km || 
|-id=516 bgcolor=#d6d6d6
| 595516 ||  || — || March 26, 2003 || Palomar || NEAT ||  || align=right | 2.6 km || 
|-id=517 bgcolor=#fefefe
| 595517 ||  || — || April 22, 2007 || Mount Lemmon || Mount Lemmon Survey ||  || align=right data-sort-value="0.75" | 750 m || 
|-id=518 bgcolor=#d6d6d6
| 595518 ||  || — || February 7, 2008 || Kitt Peak || Spacewatch ||  || align=right | 1.8 km || 
|-id=519 bgcolor=#d6d6d6
| 595519 ||  || — || October 26, 1995 || Kitt Peak || Spacewatch ||  || align=right | 2.5 km || 
|-id=520 bgcolor=#fefefe
| 595520 ||  || — || March 26, 2003 || Kitt Peak || Spacewatch ||  || align=right data-sort-value="0.75" | 750 m || 
|-id=521 bgcolor=#d6d6d6
| 595521 ||  || — || April 30, 2014 || Haleakala || Pan-STARRS ||  || align=right | 2.0 km || 
|-id=522 bgcolor=#C2FFFF
| 595522 ||  || — || September 28, 2009 || Kitt Peak || Spacewatch || L4 || align=right | 5.9 km || 
|-id=523 bgcolor=#d6d6d6
| 595523 ||  || — || May 18, 2015 || Haleakala || Pan-STARRS 2 ||  || align=right | 2.1 km || 
|-id=524 bgcolor=#d6d6d6
| 595524 ||  || — || March 26, 2003 || Kitt Peak || Spacewatch ||  || align=right | 2.2 km || 
|-id=525 bgcolor=#FA8072
| 595525 ||  || — || April 2, 2003 || Socorro || LINEAR ||  || align=right | 2.4 km || 
|-id=526 bgcolor=#d6d6d6
| 595526 ||  || — || March 22, 2003 || Ondrejov || L. Kotková ||  || align=right | 2.2 km || 
|-id=527 bgcolor=#d6d6d6
| 595527 ||  || — || April 4, 2003 || Kitt Peak || Spacewatch ||  || align=right | 1.9 km || 
|-id=528 bgcolor=#d6d6d6
| 595528 ||  || — || April 7, 2003 || Kitt Peak || Spacewatch ||  || align=right | 2.5 km || 
|-id=529 bgcolor=#C2FFFF
| 595529 ||  || — || April 20, 2004 || Kitt Peak || Spacewatch || L4 || align=right | 9.2 km || 
|-id=530 bgcolor=#E9E9E9
| 595530 ||  || — || April 7, 2007 || Mount Lemmon || Mount Lemmon Survey ||  || align=right | 1.4 km || 
|-id=531 bgcolor=#fefefe
| 595531 ||  || — || January 25, 2009 || Kitt Peak || Spacewatch ||  || align=right data-sort-value="0.72" | 720 m || 
|-id=532 bgcolor=#fefefe
| 595532 ||  || — || March 4, 2016 || Haleakala || Pan-STARRS || H || align=right data-sort-value="0.45" | 450 m || 
|-id=533 bgcolor=#C2FFFF
| 595533 ||  || — || April 7, 2003 || Kitt Peak || Spacewatch || L4 || align=right | 6.7 km || 
|-id=534 bgcolor=#d6d6d6
| 595534 ||  || — || May 22, 2015 || Haleakala || Pan-STARRS ||  || align=right | 2.1 km || 
|-id=535 bgcolor=#d6d6d6
| 595535 ||  || — || September 21, 2000 || Kitt Peak || R. Millis, R. M. Wagner ||  || align=right | 2.2 km || 
|-id=536 bgcolor=#E9E9E9
| 595536 ||  || — || April 8, 2003 || Kitt Peak || Spacewatch ||  || align=right data-sort-value="0.81" | 810 m || 
|-id=537 bgcolor=#d6d6d6
| 595537 ||  || — || May 3, 2014 || Kitt Peak || Spacewatch ||  || align=right | 1.9 km || 
|-id=538 bgcolor=#C2FFFF
| 595538 ||  || — || November 8, 2010 || Mount Lemmon || Mount Lemmon Survey || L4 || align=right | 7.0 km || 
|-id=539 bgcolor=#E9E9E9
| 595539 ||  || — || April 7, 2003 || Kitt Peak || Spacewatch ||  || align=right | 1.1 km || 
|-id=540 bgcolor=#d6d6d6
| 595540 ||  || — || April 1, 2003 || Apache Point || SDSS Collaboration ||  || align=right | 2.3 km || 
|-id=541 bgcolor=#E9E9E9
| 595541 ||  || — || April 24, 2003 || Kitt Peak || Spacewatch ||  || align=right | 1.5 km || 
|-id=542 bgcolor=#fefefe
| 595542 ||  || — || April 29, 2003 || Kitt Peak || Spacewatch ||  || align=right data-sort-value="0.56" | 560 m || 
|-id=543 bgcolor=#fefefe
| 595543 ||  || — || April 30, 2003 || Kitt Peak || Spacewatch ||  || align=right data-sort-value="0.50" | 500 m || 
|-id=544 bgcolor=#E9E9E9
| 595544 ||  || — || October 25, 2005 || Kitt Peak || Spacewatch ||  || align=right | 1.2 km || 
|-id=545 bgcolor=#E9E9E9
| 595545 ||  || — || December 1, 2005 || Kitt Peak || Spacewatch ||  || align=right | 1.2 km || 
|-id=546 bgcolor=#E9E9E9
| 595546 ||  || — || September 14, 2004 || Palomar || NEAT ||  || align=right | 1.1 km || 
|-id=547 bgcolor=#E9E9E9
| 595547 ||  || — || April 29, 2003 || Kitt Peak || Spacewatch ||  || align=right | 2.1 km || 
|-id=548 bgcolor=#d6d6d6
| 595548 ||  || — || April 28, 2003 || Kitt Peak || Spacewatch ||  || align=right | 2.2 km || 
|-id=549 bgcolor=#d6d6d6
| 595549 ||  || — || February 14, 2013 || Haleakala || Pan-STARRS ||  || align=right | 1.7 km || 
|-id=550 bgcolor=#fefefe
| 595550 ||  || — || November 21, 2008 || Mount Lemmon || Mount Lemmon Survey ||  || align=right data-sort-value="0.67" | 670 m || 
|-id=551 bgcolor=#d6d6d6
| 595551 ||  || — || August 14, 2015 || Haleakala || Pan-STARRS ||  || align=right | 2.0 km || 
|-id=552 bgcolor=#d6d6d6
| 595552 ||  || — || April 29, 2003 || Kitt Peak || Spacewatch ||  || align=right | 2.1 km || 
|-id=553 bgcolor=#E9E9E9
| 595553 ||  || — || April 25, 2003 || Kitt Peak || Spacewatch ||  || align=right | 1.2 km || 
|-id=554 bgcolor=#d6d6d6
| 595554 ||  || — || May 1, 2003 || Kitt Peak || Spacewatch ||  || align=right | 2.6 km || 
|-id=555 bgcolor=#d6d6d6
| 595555 ||  || — || May 1, 2003 || Kitt Peak || Spacewatch ||  || align=right | 2.1 km || 
|-id=556 bgcolor=#d6d6d6
| 595556 ||  || — || April 28, 1992 || Kitt Peak || Spacewatch ||  || align=right | 2.6 km || 
|-id=557 bgcolor=#d6d6d6
| 595557 ||  || — || May 1, 2003 || Kitt Peak || Spacewatch ||  || align=right | 2.3 km || 
|-id=558 bgcolor=#E9E9E9
| 595558 ||  || — || May 11, 2003 || Kitt Peak || Spacewatch ||  || align=right data-sort-value="0.91" | 910 m || 
|-id=559 bgcolor=#E9E9E9
| 595559 ||  || — || May 2, 2003 || Kitt Peak || Spacewatch ||  || align=right data-sort-value="0.64" | 640 m || 
|-id=560 bgcolor=#d6d6d6
| 595560 ||  || — || March 27, 2008 || Mount Lemmon || Mount Lemmon Survey ||  || align=right | 2.2 km || 
|-id=561 bgcolor=#fefefe
| 595561 ||  || — || May 2, 2003 || Kitt Peak || Spacewatch || H || align=right data-sort-value="0.50" | 500 m || 
|-id=562 bgcolor=#d6d6d6
| 595562 ||  || — || May 2, 2003 || Kitt Peak || Spacewatch ||  || align=right | 2.5 km || 
|-id=563 bgcolor=#C2FFFF
| 595563 ||  || — || May 6, 2003 || Kitt Peak || Spacewatch || L4 || align=right | 6.8 km || 
|-id=564 bgcolor=#d6d6d6
| 595564 ||  || — || May 22, 2003 || Kitt Peak || Spacewatch ||  || align=right | 2.7 km || 
|-id=565 bgcolor=#E9E9E9
| 595565 ||  || — || May 25, 2003 || Kitt Peak || Spacewatch ||  || align=right | 1.2 km || 
|-id=566 bgcolor=#E9E9E9
| 595566 ||  || — || May 1, 2003 || Kitt Peak || Spacewatch ||  || align=right data-sort-value="0.80" | 800 m || 
|-id=567 bgcolor=#d6d6d6
| 595567 ||  || — || May 25, 2003 || Kitt Peak || Spacewatch ||  || align=right | 3.0 km || 
|-id=568 bgcolor=#fefefe
| 595568 ||  || — || May 27, 2003 || Kitt Peak || Spacewatch || H || align=right data-sort-value="0.58" | 580 m || 
|-id=569 bgcolor=#d6d6d6
| 595569 ||  || — || May 24, 2003 || Kitt Peak || Spacewatch || Tj (2.94) || align=right | 2.4 km || 
|-id=570 bgcolor=#E9E9E9
| 595570 ||  || — || July 13, 2016 || Haleakala || Pan-STARRS ||  || align=right | 1.2 km || 
|-id=571 bgcolor=#fefefe
| 595571 ||  || — || April 2, 2006 || Kitt Peak || Spacewatch ||  || align=right data-sort-value="0.69" | 690 m || 
|-id=572 bgcolor=#d6d6d6
| 595572 ||  || — || January 3, 2012 || Mount Lemmon || Mount Lemmon Survey ||  || align=right | 2.7 km || 
|-id=573 bgcolor=#E9E9E9
| 595573 ||  || — || June 2, 2003 || Kitt Peak || Spacewatch ||  || align=right | 2.6 km || 
|-id=574 bgcolor=#E9E9E9
| 595574 ||  || — || April 18, 2007 || Kitt Peak || Spacewatch ||  || align=right data-sort-value="0.82" | 820 m || 
|-id=575 bgcolor=#fefefe
| 595575 ||  || — || October 9, 2007 || Mount Lemmon || Mount Lemmon Survey ||  || align=right data-sort-value="0.60" | 600 m || 
|-id=576 bgcolor=#d6d6d6
| 595576 ||  || — || March 30, 2008 || Kitt Peak || Spacewatch ||  || align=right | 2.1 km || 
|-id=577 bgcolor=#d6d6d6
| 595577 ||  || — || August 10, 2015 || Haleakala || Pan-STARRS ||  || align=right | 2.2 km || 
|-id=578 bgcolor=#fefefe
| 595578 ||  || — || October 26, 2011 || Haleakala || Pan-STARRS ||  || align=right data-sort-value="0.63" | 630 m || 
|-id=579 bgcolor=#fefefe
| 595579 ||  || — || July 25, 2003 || Reedy Creek || J. Broughton ||  || align=right data-sort-value="0.83" | 830 m || 
|-id=580 bgcolor=#E9E9E9
| 595580 ||  || — || May 28, 2003 || Kitt Peak || Spacewatch ||  || align=right | 1.4 km || 
|-id=581 bgcolor=#E9E9E9
| 595581 ||  || — || July 23, 2003 || Palomar || NEAT ||  || align=right | 1.7 km || 
|-id=582 bgcolor=#E9E9E9
| 595582 ||  || — || June 6, 2003 || Kitt Peak || Spacewatch ||  || align=right | 1.1 km || 
|-id=583 bgcolor=#E9E9E9
| 595583 ||  || — || July 31, 2003 || Mauna Kea || Mauna Kea Obs. ||  || align=right | 1.1 km || 
|-id=584 bgcolor=#E9E9E9
| 595584 ||  || — || September 21, 2012 || Kitt Peak || Spacewatch ||  || align=right | 1.1 km || 
|-id=585 bgcolor=#fefefe
| 595585 ||  || — || July 23, 2003 || Socorro || LINEAR ||  || align=right data-sort-value="0.75" | 750 m || 
|-id=586 bgcolor=#d6d6d6
| 595586 ||  || — || August 19, 2003 || Campo Imperatore || CINEOS || 3:2 || align=right | 5.7 km || 
|-id=587 bgcolor=#E9E9E9
| 595587 ||  || — || July 30, 2003 || Palomar || NEAT || EUN || align=right | 1.5 km || 
|-id=588 bgcolor=#E9E9E9
| 595588 ||  || — || August 24, 2003 || Palomar || NEAT ||  || align=right data-sort-value="0.79" | 790 m || 
|-id=589 bgcolor=#E9E9E9
| 595589 ||  || — || August 26, 2003 || Cerro Tololo || Cerro Tololo Obs. ||  || align=right data-sort-value="0.83" | 830 m || 
|-id=590 bgcolor=#E9E9E9
| 595590 ||  || — || August 24, 2003 || Saint-Sulpice || B. Christophe || EUN || align=right | 1.4 km || 
|-id=591 bgcolor=#E9E9E9
| 595591 ||  || — || August 31, 2003 || Kitt Peak || Spacewatch ||  || align=right | 1.3 km || 
|-id=592 bgcolor=#d6d6d6
| 595592 ||  || — || August 26, 1998 || Kitt Peak || Spacewatch ||  || align=right | 2.5 km || 
|-id=593 bgcolor=#E9E9E9
| 595593 ||  || — || August 28, 2003 || Palomar || NEAT ||  || align=right | 1.1 km || 
|-id=594 bgcolor=#d6d6d6
| 595594 ||  || — || March 15, 2012 || Mount Lemmon || Mount Lemmon Survey ||  || align=right | 2.9 km || 
|-id=595 bgcolor=#E9E9E9
| 595595 ||  || — || November 24, 2012 || Kitt Peak || Spacewatch ||  || align=right | 1.3 km || 
|-id=596 bgcolor=#fefefe
| 595596 ||  || — || August 21, 2003 || Palomar || NEAT ||  || align=right data-sort-value="0.69" | 690 m || 
|-id=597 bgcolor=#E9E9E9
| 595597 ||  || — || August 24, 2003 || Cerro Tololo || Cerro Tololo Obs. ||  || align=right | 1.1 km || 
|-id=598 bgcolor=#d6d6d6
| 595598 ||  || — || July 7, 2014 || Haleakala || Pan-STARRS ||  || align=right | 2.3 km || 
|-id=599 bgcolor=#d6d6d6
| 595599 ||  || — || August 25, 2003 || Cerro Tololo || Cerro Tololo Obs. ||  || align=right | 2.1 km || 
|-id=600 bgcolor=#E9E9E9
| 595600 ||  || — || August 22, 2003 || Campo Imperatore || A. Boattini, A. Di Paola ||  || align=right | 1.6 km || 
|}

595601–595700 

|-bgcolor=#fefefe
| 595601 ||  || — || November 14, 2007 || Mount Lemmon || Mount Lemmon Survey ||  || align=right data-sort-value="0.62" | 620 m || 
|-id=602 bgcolor=#d6d6d6
| 595602 ||  || — || April 2, 2013 || Kitt Peak || Spacewatch ||  || align=right | 2.3 km || 
|-id=603 bgcolor=#E9E9E9
| 595603 ||  || — || September 4, 2003 || Kitt Peak || Spacewatch ||  || align=right | 1.5 km || 
|-id=604 bgcolor=#fefefe
| 595604 ||  || — || September 16, 2003 || Kitt Peak || Spacewatch ||  || align=right data-sort-value="0.50" | 500 m || 
|-id=605 bgcolor=#E9E9E9
| 595605 ||  || — || September 17, 2003 || Kitt Peak || Spacewatch ||  || align=right | 1.5 km || 
|-id=606 bgcolor=#E9E9E9
| 595606 ||  || — || August 25, 2003 || Palomar || NEAT ||  || align=right | 2.0 km || 
|-id=607 bgcolor=#E9E9E9
| 595607 ||  || — || September 17, 2003 || Palomar || NEAT ||  || align=right | 1.1 km || 
|-id=608 bgcolor=#fefefe
| 595608 ||  || — || September 18, 2003 || Palomar || NEAT ||  || align=right data-sort-value="0.85" | 850 m || 
|-id=609 bgcolor=#E9E9E9
| 595609 ||  || — || September 17, 2003 || Uccle || T. Pauwels ||  || align=right | 2.5 km || 
|-id=610 bgcolor=#E9E9E9
| 595610 ||  || — || September 13, 2003 || Haleakala || AMOS || EUN || align=right | 1.4 km || 
|-id=611 bgcolor=#d6d6d6
| 595611 ||  || — || September 2, 2003 || Socorro || LINEAR ||  || align=right | 2.3 km || 
|-id=612 bgcolor=#fefefe
| 595612 ||  || — || August 28, 2003 || Socorro || LINEAR ||  || align=right data-sort-value="0.75" | 750 m || 
|-id=613 bgcolor=#d6d6d6
| 595613 ||  || — || September 18, 2003 || Kitt Peak || Spacewatch ||  || align=right | 2.3 km || 
|-id=614 bgcolor=#E9E9E9
| 595614 ||  || — || September 19, 2003 || Haleakala || AMOS ||  || align=right data-sort-value="0.86" | 860 m || 
|-id=615 bgcolor=#E9E9E9
| 595615 ||  || — || September 20, 2003 || Kitt Peak || Spacewatch ||  || align=right | 1.2 km || 
|-id=616 bgcolor=#fefefe
| 595616 ||  || — || September 16, 2003 || Kitt Peak || Spacewatch ||  || align=right data-sort-value="0.70" | 700 m || 
|-id=617 bgcolor=#E9E9E9
| 595617 ||  || — || August 27, 2003 || Haleakala || AMOS ||  || align=right | 1.8 km || 
|-id=618 bgcolor=#E9E9E9
| 595618 ||  || — || September 4, 2003 || Kitt Peak || Spacewatch ||  || align=right data-sort-value="0.88" | 880 m || 
|-id=619 bgcolor=#d6d6d6
| 595619 ||  || — || September 18, 2003 || Kitt Peak || Spacewatch ||  || align=right | 2.6 km || 
|-id=620 bgcolor=#fefefe
| 595620 ||  || — || September 18, 2003 || Palomar || NEAT || H || align=right data-sort-value="0.68" | 680 m || 
|-id=621 bgcolor=#E9E9E9
| 595621 ||  || — || September 20, 2003 || Palomar || NEAT ||  || align=right | 1.6 km || 
|-id=622 bgcolor=#FA8072
| 595622 ||  || — || September 20, 2003 || Socorro || LINEAR ||  || align=right data-sort-value="0.65" | 650 m || 
|-id=623 bgcolor=#E9E9E9
| 595623 ||  || — || September 20, 2003 || Kitt Peak || Spacewatch ||  || align=right data-sort-value="0.84" | 840 m || 
|-id=624 bgcolor=#E9E9E9
| 595624 ||  || — || September 21, 2003 || Kitt Peak || Spacewatch ||  || align=right | 1.6 km || 
|-id=625 bgcolor=#E9E9E9
| 595625 ||  || — || August 26, 2003 || Cerro Tololo || Cerro Tololo Obs. ||  || align=right | 1.8 km || 
|-id=626 bgcolor=#fefefe
| 595626 ||  || — || September 16, 2003 || Socorro || LINEAR ||  || align=right data-sort-value="0.78" | 780 m || 
|-id=627 bgcolor=#fefefe
| 595627 ||  || — || September 24, 2003 || Palomar || NEAT ||  || align=right data-sort-value="0.66" | 660 m || 
|-id=628 bgcolor=#E9E9E9
| 595628 ||  || — || September 16, 2003 || Palomar || NEAT ||  || align=right | 1.3 km || 
|-id=629 bgcolor=#d6d6d6
| 595629 ||  || — || September 27, 2003 || Kitt Peak || Spacewatch || Tj (2.99) || align=right | 2.8 km || 
|-id=630 bgcolor=#E9E9E9
| 595630 ||  || — || September 30, 2003 || Kitt Peak || Spacewatch ||  || align=right | 1.3 km || 
|-id=631 bgcolor=#fefefe
| 595631 ||  || — || September 28, 2003 || Socorro || LINEAR ||  || align=right data-sort-value="0.59" | 590 m || 
|-id=632 bgcolor=#fefefe
| 595632 ||  || — || September 20, 2003 || Socorro || LINEAR ||  || align=right | 1.1 km || 
|-id=633 bgcolor=#E9E9E9
| 595633 ||  || — || September 19, 2003 || Anderson Mesa || LONEOS ||  || align=right | 2.1 km || 
|-id=634 bgcolor=#fefefe
| 595634 ||  || — || September 16, 2003 || Palomar || NEAT ||  || align=right data-sort-value="0.61" | 610 m || 
|-id=635 bgcolor=#d6d6d6
| 595635 ||  || — || September 17, 2003 || Kitt Peak || Spacewatch ||  || align=right | 4.1 km || 
|-id=636 bgcolor=#E9E9E9
| 595636 ||  || — || September 17, 2003 || Kitt Peak || Spacewatch ||  || align=right | 1.5 km || 
|-id=637 bgcolor=#E9E9E9
| 595637 ||  || — || September 17, 2003 || Kitt Peak || Spacewatch ||  || align=right | 1.3 km || 
|-id=638 bgcolor=#d6d6d6
| 595638 ||  || — || September 18, 2003 || Kitt Peak || Spacewatch ||  || align=right | 2.2 km || 
|-id=639 bgcolor=#E9E9E9
| 595639 ||  || — || September 18, 2003 || Kitt Peak || Spacewatch || EUN || align=right data-sort-value="0.71" | 710 m || 
|-id=640 bgcolor=#fefefe
| 595640 ||  || — || September 18, 2003 || Palomar || NEAT ||  || align=right data-sort-value="0.89" | 890 m || 
|-id=641 bgcolor=#d6d6d6
| 595641 ||  || — || March 10, 2005 || Mount Lemmon || Mount Lemmon Survey ||  || align=right | 3.0 km || 
|-id=642 bgcolor=#fefefe
| 595642 ||  || — || September 21, 2003 || Kitt Peak || Spacewatch ||  || align=right data-sort-value="0.50" | 500 m || 
|-id=643 bgcolor=#fefefe
| 595643 ||  || — || September 16, 2003 || Kitt Peak || Spacewatch ||  || align=right data-sort-value="0.50" | 500 m || 
|-id=644 bgcolor=#d6d6d6
| 595644 ||  || — || September 26, 2003 || Apache Point || SDSS Collaboration ||  || align=right | 2.4 km || 
|-id=645 bgcolor=#fefefe
| 595645 ||  || — || September 26, 2003 || Apache Point || SDSS Collaboration ||  || align=right data-sort-value="0.52" | 520 m || 
|-id=646 bgcolor=#E9E9E9
| 595646 ||  || — || October 2, 2003 || Kitt Peak || Spacewatch ||  || align=right | 1.1 km || 
|-id=647 bgcolor=#E9E9E9
| 595647 ||  || — || September 26, 2003 || Apache Point || SDSS Collaboration ||  || align=right | 1.3 km || 
|-id=648 bgcolor=#E9E9E9
| 595648 ||  || — || September 27, 2003 || Kitt Peak || Spacewatch || AGN || align=right | 1.1 km || 
|-id=649 bgcolor=#E9E9E9
| 595649 ||  || — || October 16, 2003 || Palomar || NEAT ||  || align=right | 1.7 km || 
|-id=650 bgcolor=#fefefe
| 595650 ||  || — || September 28, 2003 || Kitt Peak || Spacewatch ||  || align=right data-sort-value="0.55" | 550 m || 
|-id=651 bgcolor=#E9E9E9
| 595651 ||  || — || September 18, 2003 || Kitt Peak || Spacewatch ||  || align=right data-sort-value="0.92" | 920 m || 
|-id=652 bgcolor=#fefefe
| 595652 ||  || — || September 27, 2003 || Kitt Peak || Spacewatch ||  || align=right data-sort-value="0.43" | 430 m || 
|-id=653 bgcolor=#E9E9E9
| 595653 ||  || — || September 18, 2003 || Kitt Peak || Spacewatch ||  || align=right | 1.2 km || 
|-id=654 bgcolor=#fefefe
| 595654 ||  || — || September 26, 2003 || Apache Point || SDSS Collaboration ||  || align=right data-sort-value="0.64" | 640 m || 
|-id=655 bgcolor=#d6d6d6
| 595655 ||  || — || December 19, 2004 || Mount Lemmon || Mount Lemmon Survey ||  || align=right | 3.0 km || 
|-id=656 bgcolor=#fefefe
| 595656 ||  || — || September 26, 2003 || Apache Point || SDSS Collaboration ||  || align=right data-sort-value="0.71" | 710 m || 
|-id=657 bgcolor=#d6d6d6
| 595657 ||  || — || February 1, 2006 || Mount Lemmon || Mount Lemmon Survey ||  || align=right | 2.3 km || 
|-id=658 bgcolor=#fefefe
| 595658 ||  || — || October 12, 2007 || Kitt Peak || Spacewatch ||  || align=right data-sort-value="0.73" | 730 m || 
|-id=659 bgcolor=#E9E9E9
| 595659 ||  || — || September 28, 2003 || Kitt Peak || Spacewatch ||  || align=right | 1.1 km || 
|-id=660 bgcolor=#E9E9E9
| 595660 ||  || — || September 18, 2003 || Kitt Peak || Spacewatch ||  || align=right | 1.6 km || 
|-id=661 bgcolor=#fefefe
| 595661 ||  || — || September 16, 2003 || Kitt Peak || Spacewatch ||  || align=right data-sort-value="0.70" | 700 m || 
|-id=662 bgcolor=#E9E9E9
| 595662 ||  || — || January 17, 2005 || Kitt Peak || Spacewatch ||  || align=right | 1.9 km || 
|-id=663 bgcolor=#fefefe
| 595663 ||  || — || September 21, 2003 || Kitt Peak || Spacewatch ||  || align=right data-sort-value="0.69" | 690 m || 
|-id=664 bgcolor=#fefefe
| 595664 ||  || — || September 28, 2003 || Kitt Peak || Spacewatch ||  || align=right data-sort-value="0.53" | 530 m || 
|-id=665 bgcolor=#fefefe
| 595665 ||  || — || September 21, 2003 || Kitt Peak || Spacewatch ||  || align=right data-sort-value="0.67" | 670 m || 
|-id=666 bgcolor=#E9E9E9
| 595666 ||  || — || October 19, 2012 || Mount Lemmon || Mount Lemmon Survey ||  || align=right | 1.8 km || 
|-id=667 bgcolor=#E9E9E9
| 595667 ||  || — || July 17, 2016 || Haleakala || Pan-STARRS ||  || align=right data-sort-value="0.86" | 860 m || 
|-id=668 bgcolor=#fefefe
| 595668 ||  || — || September 21, 2003 || Kitt Peak || Spacewatch ||  || align=right data-sort-value="0.71" | 710 m || 
|-id=669 bgcolor=#E9E9E9
| 595669 ||  || — || June 13, 2015 || Mount Lemmon || Mount Lemmon Survey ||  || align=right | 1.2 km || 
|-id=670 bgcolor=#E9E9E9
| 595670 ||  || — || September 18, 2003 || Kitt Peak || Spacewatch ||  || align=right | 1.4 km || 
|-id=671 bgcolor=#fefefe
| 595671 ||  || — || June 12, 2013 || Haleakala || Pan-STARRS ||  || align=right data-sort-value="0.61" | 610 m || 
|-id=672 bgcolor=#E9E9E9
| 595672 ||  || — || October 14, 2012 || Kitt Peak || Spacewatch ||  || align=right | 1.1 km || 
|-id=673 bgcolor=#fefefe
| 595673 ||  || — || September 28, 2003 || Apache Point || SDSS Collaboration ||  || align=right data-sort-value="0.56" | 560 m || 
|-id=674 bgcolor=#d6d6d6
| 595674 ||  || — || September 12, 2015 || Haleakala || Pan-STARRS ||  || align=right | 2.4 km || 
|-id=675 bgcolor=#d6d6d6
| 595675 ||  || — || January 29, 2012 || Mount Lemmon || Mount Lemmon Survey ||  || align=right | 2.4 km || 
|-id=676 bgcolor=#E9E9E9
| 595676 ||  || — || February 17, 2010 || Kitt Peak || Spacewatch ||  || align=right | 1.2 km || 
|-id=677 bgcolor=#E9E9E9
| 595677 ||  || — || January 21, 2015 || Haleakala || Pan-STARRS ||  || align=right | 1.8 km || 
|-id=678 bgcolor=#E9E9E9
| 595678 ||  || — || June 28, 2011 || Mount Lemmon || Mount Lemmon Survey ||  || align=right data-sort-value="0.70" | 700 m || 
|-id=679 bgcolor=#E9E9E9
| 595679 ||  || — || September 21, 2003 || Kitt Peak || Spacewatch ||  || align=right data-sort-value="0.76" | 760 m || 
|-id=680 bgcolor=#d6d6d6
| 595680 ||  || — || October 25, 2009 || Kitt Peak || Spacewatch ||  || align=right | 2.0 km || 
|-id=681 bgcolor=#E9E9E9
| 595681 ||  || — || September 19, 2003 || Kitt Peak || Spacewatch ||  || align=right | 1.1 km || 
|-id=682 bgcolor=#E9E9E9
| 595682 ||  || — || April 25, 2015 || Haleakala || Pan-STARRS ||  || align=right data-sort-value="0.99" | 990 m || 
|-id=683 bgcolor=#fefefe
| 595683 ||  || — || September 30, 2003 || Kitt Peak || Spacewatch || H || align=right data-sort-value="0.43" | 430 m || 
|-id=684 bgcolor=#E9E9E9
| 595684 ||  || — || September 22, 2003 || Kitt Peak || Spacewatch ||  || align=right | 1.7 km || 
|-id=685 bgcolor=#fefefe
| 595685 ||  || — || September 22, 2003 || Kitt Peak || Spacewatch ||  || align=right data-sort-value="0.63" | 630 m || 
|-id=686 bgcolor=#E9E9E9
| 595686 ||  || — || September 30, 2003 || Kitt Peak || Spacewatch ||  || align=right | 1.4 km || 
|-id=687 bgcolor=#fefefe
| 595687 ||  || — || September 21, 2003 || Kitt Peak || Spacewatch ||  || align=right data-sort-value="0.67" | 670 m || 
|-id=688 bgcolor=#E9E9E9
| 595688 ||  || — || September 19, 2003 || Kitt Peak || Spacewatch ||  || align=right | 1.7 km || 
|-id=689 bgcolor=#E9E9E9
| 595689 ||  || — || October 1, 2003 || Kitt Peak || Spacewatch ||  || align=right | 1.1 km || 
|-id=690 bgcolor=#E9E9E9
| 595690 ||  || — || October 2, 2003 || Kitt Peak || Spacewatch ||  || align=right | 1.2 km || 
|-id=691 bgcolor=#d6d6d6
| 595691 ||  || — || October 2, 2003 || Kitt Peak || Spacewatch ||  || align=right | 2.9 km || 
|-id=692 bgcolor=#E9E9E9
| 595692 ||  || — || October 5, 2003 || Kitt Peak || Spacewatch ||  || align=right | 1.5 km || 
|-id=693 bgcolor=#E9E9E9
| 595693 ||  || — || October 16, 2012 || Catalina || CSS ||  || align=right | 1.8 km || 
|-id=694 bgcolor=#E9E9E9
| 595694 ||  || — || October 1, 2003 || Kitt Peak || Spacewatch ||  || align=right | 1.6 km || 
|-id=695 bgcolor=#E9E9E9
| 595695 ||  || — || October 1, 2003 || Kitt Peak || Spacewatch ||  || align=right | 1.7 km || 
|-id=696 bgcolor=#E9E9E9
| 595696 ||  || — || October 3, 2003 || Kitt Peak || Spacewatch ||  || align=right | 1.3 km || 
|-id=697 bgcolor=#fefefe
| 595697 ||  || — || October 1, 2003 || Kitt Peak || Spacewatch ||  || align=right data-sort-value="0.57" | 570 m || 
|-id=698 bgcolor=#d6d6d6
| 595698 ||  || — || October 16, 2003 || Palomar || NEAT ||  || align=right | 2.4 km || 
|-id=699 bgcolor=#E9E9E9
| 595699 ||  || — || October 16, 2003 || Kitt Peak || Spacewatch ||  || align=right | 1.4 km || 
|-id=700 bgcolor=#E9E9E9
| 595700 ||  || — || October 16, 2003 || Kitt Peak || Spacewatch ||  || align=right | 1.1 km || 
|}

595701–595800 

|-bgcolor=#fefefe
| 595701 ||  || — || October 16, 2003 || Palomar || NEAT ||  || align=right data-sort-value="0.44" | 440 m || 
|-id=702 bgcolor=#E9E9E9
| 595702 ||  || — || August 28, 2003 || Palomar || NEAT ||  || align=right data-sort-value="0.93" | 930 m || 
|-id=703 bgcolor=#FA8072
| 595703 ||  || — || October 16, 2003 || Palomar || NEAT ||  || align=right data-sort-value="0.74" | 740 m || 
|-id=704 bgcolor=#E9E9E9
| 595704 ||  || — || October 18, 2003 || Kitt Peak || Spacewatch ||  || align=right data-sort-value="0.89" | 890 m || 
|-id=705 bgcolor=#fefefe
| 595705 ||  || — || September 28, 2003 || Kitt Peak || Spacewatch ||  || align=right data-sort-value="0.74" | 740 m || 
|-id=706 bgcolor=#fefefe
| 595706 ||  || — || September 30, 2003 || Kitt Peak || Spacewatch ||  || align=right data-sort-value="0.99" | 990 m || 
|-id=707 bgcolor=#E9E9E9
| 595707 ||  || — || October 18, 2003 || Kitt Peak || Spacewatch ||  || align=right | 1.7 km || 
|-id=708 bgcolor=#d6d6d6
| 595708 ||  || — || September 18, 2003 || Kitt Peak || Spacewatch ||  || align=right | 1.9 km || 
|-id=709 bgcolor=#E9E9E9
| 595709 ||  || — || September 28, 2003 || Anderson Mesa || LONEOS ||  || align=right | 3.0 km || 
|-id=710 bgcolor=#fefefe
| 595710 ||  || — || October 18, 2003 || Palomar || NEAT ||  || align=right | 1.3 km || 
|-id=711 bgcolor=#E9E9E9
| 595711 ||  || — || October 19, 2003 || Palomar || NEAT || ADE || align=right | 2.6 km || 
|-id=712 bgcolor=#fefefe
| 595712 ||  || — || October 20, 2003 || Kitt Peak || Spacewatch ||  || align=right data-sort-value="0.59" | 590 m || 
|-id=713 bgcolor=#E9E9E9
| 595713 ||  || — || September 19, 2003 || Kitt Peak || Spacewatch ||  || align=right | 1.2 km || 
|-id=714 bgcolor=#fefefe
| 595714 ||  || — || October 23, 2003 || Kitt Peak || Spacewatch ||  || align=right data-sort-value="0.71" | 710 m || 
|-id=715 bgcolor=#E9E9E9
| 595715 ||  || — || September 29, 2003 || Socorro || LINEAR ||  || align=right | 2.2 km || 
|-id=716 bgcolor=#fefefe
| 595716 ||  || — || September 23, 2003 || Palomar || NEAT ||  || align=right data-sort-value="0.87" | 870 m || 
|-id=717 bgcolor=#E9E9E9
| 595717 ||  || — || October 20, 2003 || Socorro || LINEAR ||  || align=right | 1.6 km || 
|-id=718 bgcolor=#FA8072
| 595718 ||  || — || October 23, 2003 || Kitt Peak || Spacewatch ||  || align=right | 1.0 km || 
|-id=719 bgcolor=#fefefe
| 595719 ||  || — || October 23, 2003 || Kitt Peak || Spacewatch ||  || align=right data-sort-value="0.58" | 580 m || 
|-id=720 bgcolor=#d6d6d6
| 595720 ||  || — || September 22, 2003 || Kitt Peak || Spacewatch ||  || align=right | 2.1 km || 
|-id=721 bgcolor=#d6d6d6
| 595721 ||  || — || October 17, 2003 || Kitt Peak || Spacewatch ||  || align=right | 2.4 km || 
|-id=722 bgcolor=#d6d6d6
| 595722 ||  || — || October 19, 2003 || Kitt Peak || Spacewatch ||  || align=right | 2.7 km || 
|-id=723 bgcolor=#E9E9E9
| 595723 ||  || — || October 20, 2003 || Socorro || LINEAR || EUN || align=right | 1.5 km || 
|-id=724 bgcolor=#E9E9E9
| 595724 ||  || — || October 16, 2003 || Kitt Peak || Spacewatch ||  || align=right | 1.2 km || 
|-id=725 bgcolor=#d6d6d6
| 595725 ||  || — || September 30, 2003 || Kitt Peak || Spacewatch ||  || align=right | 1.9 km || 
|-id=726 bgcolor=#fefefe
| 595726 ||  || — || September 17, 2003 || Kitt Peak || Spacewatch ||  || align=right data-sort-value="0.69" | 690 m || 
|-id=727 bgcolor=#E9E9E9
| 595727 ||  || — || October 17, 2003 || Kitt Peak || Spacewatch ||  || align=right | 1.4 km || 
|-id=728 bgcolor=#E9E9E9
| 595728 ||  || — || October 18, 2003 || Apache Point || SDSS Collaboration ||  || align=right | 1.3 km || 
|-id=729 bgcolor=#E9E9E9
| 595729 ||  || — || October 18, 2003 || Apache Point || SDSS Collaboration ||  || align=right | 1.2 km || 
|-id=730 bgcolor=#E9E9E9
| 595730 ||  || — || September 30, 2003 || Kitt Peak || Spacewatch || EUN || align=right | 1.5 km || 
|-id=731 bgcolor=#E9E9E9
| 595731 ||  || — || October 19, 2003 || Apache Point || SDSS Collaboration ||  || align=right | 1.1 km || 
|-id=732 bgcolor=#fefefe
| 595732 ||  || — || September 29, 2003 || Kitt Peak || Spacewatch ||  || align=right data-sort-value="0.49" | 490 m || 
|-id=733 bgcolor=#E9E9E9
| 595733 ||  || — || October 20, 2003 || Kitt Peak || Spacewatch ||  || align=right | 1.9 km || 
|-id=734 bgcolor=#E9E9E9
| 595734 ||  || — || September 29, 2003 || Kitt Peak || Spacewatch ||  || align=right | 1.5 km || 
|-id=735 bgcolor=#E9E9E9
| 595735 ||  || — || April 1, 2005 || Kitt Peak || Spacewatch ||  || align=right | 1.8 km || 
|-id=736 bgcolor=#E9E9E9
| 595736 ||  || — || October 22, 2003 || Apache Point || SDSS Collaboration ||  || align=right | 1.6 km || 
|-id=737 bgcolor=#fefefe
| 595737 ||  || — || September 21, 2003 || Anderson Mesa || LONEOS ||  || align=right data-sort-value="0.56" | 560 m || 
|-id=738 bgcolor=#E9E9E9
| 595738 ||  || — || July 4, 2003 || Kitt Peak || Spacewatch ||  || align=right | 1.8 km || 
|-id=739 bgcolor=#fefefe
| 595739 ||  || — || September 30, 2003 || Apache Point || SDSS Collaboration ||  || align=right data-sort-value="0.46" | 460 m || 
|-id=740 bgcolor=#fefefe
| 595740 ||  || — || October 23, 2003 || Apache Point || SDSS Collaboration ||  || align=right data-sort-value="0.59" | 590 m || 
|-id=741 bgcolor=#fefefe
| 595741 ||  || — || October 23, 2003 || Apache Point || SDSS Collaboration ||  || align=right data-sort-value="0.72" | 720 m || 
|-id=742 bgcolor=#fefefe
| 595742 ||  || — || October 29, 2003 || Kitt Peak || Spacewatch ||  || align=right | 1.0 km || 
|-id=743 bgcolor=#fefefe
| 595743 ||  || — || October 22, 2003 || Kitt Peak || Spacewatch ||  || align=right data-sort-value="0.81" | 810 m || 
|-id=744 bgcolor=#E9E9E9
| 595744 ||  || — || November 23, 2008 || Kitt Peak || Spacewatch ||  || align=right | 1.7 km || 
|-id=745 bgcolor=#E9E9E9
| 595745 ||  || — || October 22, 2003 || Kitt Peak || Spacewatch ||  || align=right | 1.9 km || 
|-id=746 bgcolor=#fefefe
| 595746 ||  || — || March 3, 2009 || Kitt Peak || Spacewatch ||  || align=right data-sort-value="0.79" | 790 m || 
|-id=747 bgcolor=#fefefe
| 595747 ||  || — || November 17, 2014 || Mount Lemmon || Mount Lemmon Survey ||  || align=right data-sort-value="0.69" | 690 m || 
|-id=748 bgcolor=#E9E9E9
| 595748 ||  || — || October 18, 2012 || Haleakala || Pan-STARRS ||  || align=right | 1.6 km || 
|-id=749 bgcolor=#E9E9E9
| 595749 ||  || — || August 24, 2003 || Palomar || NEAT ||  || align=right | 1.3 km || 
|-id=750 bgcolor=#fefefe
| 595750 ||  || — || October 17, 2010 || Mount Lemmon || Mount Lemmon Survey ||  || align=right data-sort-value="0.61" | 610 m || 
|-id=751 bgcolor=#fefefe
| 595751 ||  || — || May 28, 2009 || Mount Lemmon || Mount Lemmon Survey ||  || align=right data-sort-value="0.72" | 720 m || 
|-id=752 bgcolor=#fefefe
| 595752 ||  || — || November 22, 2014 || Mount Lemmon || Mount Lemmon Survey ||  || align=right data-sort-value="0.60" | 600 m || 
|-id=753 bgcolor=#fefefe
| 595753 ||  || — || October 22, 2003 || Apache Point || SDSS Collaboration ||  || align=right data-sort-value="0.68" | 680 m || 
|-id=754 bgcolor=#d6d6d6
| 595754 ||  || — || April 17, 2013 || Haleakala || Pan-STARRS ||  || align=right | 2.9 km || 
|-id=755 bgcolor=#E9E9E9
| 595755 ||  || — || October 23, 2003 || Apache Point || SDSS Collaboration ||  || align=right | 1.3 km || 
|-id=756 bgcolor=#E9E9E9
| 595756 ||  || — || February 4, 2005 || Mount Lemmon || Mount Lemmon Survey ||  || align=right | 1.6 km || 
|-id=757 bgcolor=#fefefe
| 595757 ||  || — || October 21, 2003 || Kitt Peak || Spacewatch ||  || align=right data-sort-value="0.60" | 600 m || 
|-id=758 bgcolor=#d6d6d6
| 595758 ||  || — || April 25, 2006 || Kitt Peak || Spacewatch ||  || align=right | 2.2 km || 
|-id=759 bgcolor=#E9E9E9
| 595759 ||  || — || May 14, 2015 || Haleakala || Pan-STARRS ||  || align=right | 2.1 km || 
|-id=760 bgcolor=#fefefe
| 595760 ||  || — || April 22, 2009 || Mount Lemmon || Mount Lemmon Survey ||  || align=right data-sort-value="0.53" | 530 m || 
|-id=761 bgcolor=#E9E9E9
| 595761 ||  || — || February 27, 2014 || Kitt Peak || Spacewatch ||  || align=right | 1.3 km || 
|-id=762 bgcolor=#fefefe
| 595762 ||  || — || March 27, 2012 || Kitt Peak || Spacewatch ||  || align=right data-sort-value="0.48" | 480 m || 
|-id=763 bgcolor=#d6d6d6
| 595763 ||  || — || May 5, 2013 || Haleakala || Pan-STARRS ||  || align=right | 2.1 km || 
|-id=764 bgcolor=#fefefe
| 595764 ||  || — || December 30, 2007 || Kitt Peak || Spacewatch ||  || align=right data-sort-value="0.62" | 620 m || 
|-id=765 bgcolor=#fefefe
| 595765 ||  || — || April 1, 2012 || Mount Lemmon || Mount Lemmon Survey ||  || align=right data-sort-value="0.59" | 590 m || 
|-id=766 bgcolor=#d6d6d6
| 595766 ||  || — || June 3, 2014 || Haleakala || Pan-STARRS ||  || align=right | 2.5 km || 
|-id=767 bgcolor=#E9E9E9
| 595767 ||  || — || October 18, 2003 || Anderson Mesa || LONEOS ||  || align=right data-sort-value="0.95" | 950 m || 
|-id=768 bgcolor=#d6d6d6
| 595768 ||  || — || October 16, 2003 || Kitt Peak || Spacewatch ||  || align=right | 1.8 km || 
|-id=769 bgcolor=#E9E9E9
| 595769 ||  || — || November 15, 2003 || Kitt Peak || Spacewatch ||  || align=right | 2.5 km || 
|-id=770 bgcolor=#fefefe
| 595770 ||  || — || January 11, 2008 || Catalina || CSS ||  || align=right data-sort-value="0.75" | 750 m || 
|-id=771 bgcolor=#E9E9E9
| 595771 ||  || — || January 7, 2000 || Kitt Peak || Spacewatch ||  || align=right | 2.1 km || 
|-id=772 bgcolor=#E9E9E9
| 595772 ||  || — || September 20, 2003 || Palomar || NEAT ||  || align=right | 1.8 km || 
|-id=773 bgcolor=#E9E9E9
| 595773 ||  || — || November 15, 2003 || Palomar || NEAT ||  || align=right | 1.9 km || 
|-id=774 bgcolor=#E9E9E9
| 595774 ||  || — || November 19, 2003 || Palomar || NEAT ||  || align=right | 1.5 km || 
|-id=775 bgcolor=#fefefe
| 595775 ||  || — || November 30, 2003 || Kitt Peak || Spacewatch ||  || align=right data-sort-value="0.62" | 620 m || 
|-id=776 bgcolor=#E9E9E9
| 595776 ||  || — || November 30, 2003 || Kitt Peak || Spacewatch ||  || align=right | 2.0 km || 
|-id=777 bgcolor=#fefefe
| 595777 ||  || — || November 19, 2003 || Kitt Peak || Spacewatch ||  || align=right data-sort-value="0.54" | 540 m || 
|-id=778 bgcolor=#fefefe
| 595778 ||  || — || October 2, 2003 || Kitt Peak || Spacewatch ||  || align=right data-sort-value="0.56" | 560 m || 
|-id=779 bgcolor=#E9E9E9
| 595779 ||  || — || November 19, 2003 || Kitt Peak || Spacewatch ||  || align=right data-sort-value="0.62" | 620 m || 
|-id=780 bgcolor=#fefefe
| 595780 ||  || — || November 19, 2003 || Palomar || NEAT ||  || align=right data-sort-value="0.86" | 860 m || 
|-id=781 bgcolor=#E9E9E9
| 595781 ||  || — || November 19, 2003 || Palomar || NEAT ||  || align=right | 1.6 km || 
|-id=782 bgcolor=#E9E9E9
| 595782 ||  || — || December 22, 2008 || Mount Lemmon || Mount Lemmon Survey ||  || align=right | 1.6 km || 
|-id=783 bgcolor=#fefefe
| 595783 ||  || — || October 2, 2010 || Mount Lemmon || Mount Lemmon Survey ||  || align=right data-sort-value="0.78" | 780 m || 
|-id=784 bgcolor=#E9E9E9
| 595784 ||  || — || October 12, 2007 || Mount Lemmon || Mount Lemmon Survey ||  || align=right | 1.7 km || 
|-id=785 bgcolor=#fefefe
| 595785 ||  || — || November 19, 2003 || Anderson Mesa || LONEOS ||  || align=right data-sort-value="0.80" | 800 m || 
|-id=786 bgcolor=#E9E9E9
| 595786 ||  || — || March 30, 1997 || Kitt Peak || Spacewatch ||  || align=right | 2.8 km || 
|-id=787 bgcolor=#E9E9E9
| 595787 ||  || — || November 7, 2012 || Haleakala || Pan-STARRS ||  || align=right | 1.8 km || 
|-id=788 bgcolor=#E9E9E9
| 595788 ||  || — || June 14, 2015 || Mount Lemmon || Mount Lemmon Survey ||  || align=right | 2.1 km || 
|-id=789 bgcolor=#E9E9E9
| 595789 ||  || — || June 25, 2011 || Kitt Peak || Spacewatch ||  || align=right | 1.3 km || 
|-id=790 bgcolor=#fefefe
| 595790 ||  || — || September 4, 2010 || Kitt Peak || Spacewatch ||  || align=right data-sort-value="0.59" | 590 m || 
|-id=791 bgcolor=#E9E9E9
| 595791 ||  || — || March 16, 2010 || Mount Lemmon || Mount Lemmon Survey ||  || align=right | 1.5 km || 
|-id=792 bgcolor=#E9E9E9
| 595792 ||  || — || October 20, 2016 || Mount Lemmon || Mount Lemmon Survey ||  || align=right | 1.2 km || 
|-id=793 bgcolor=#fefefe
| 595793 ||  || — || January 18, 2008 || Kitt Peak || Spacewatch ||  || align=right data-sort-value="0.55" | 550 m || 
|-id=794 bgcolor=#fefefe
| 595794 ||  || — || December 30, 2007 || Kitt Peak || Spacewatch ||  || align=right data-sort-value="0.58" | 580 m || 
|-id=795 bgcolor=#E9E9E9
| 595795 ||  || — || November 26, 2003 || Kitt Peak || Spacewatch ||  || align=right | 1.0 km || 
|-id=796 bgcolor=#E9E9E9
| 595796 ||  || — || January 2, 2009 || Mount Lemmon || Mount Lemmon Survey ||  || align=right | 1.3 km || 
|-id=797 bgcolor=#fefefe
| 595797 ||  || — || February 5, 2016 || Haleakala || Pan-STARRS ||  || align=right data-sort-value="0.57" | 570 m || 
|-id=798 bgcolor=#d6d6d6
| 595798 ||  || — || November 19, 2003 || Kitt Peak || Spacewatch ||  || align=right | 2.3 km || 
|-id=799 bgcolor=#E9E9E9
| 595799 ||  || — || November 21, 2003 || Kitt Peak || Spacewatch ||  || align=right data-sort-value="0.59" | 590 m || 
|-id=800 bgcolor=#E9E9E9
| 595800 ||  || — || February 3, 2009 || Mount Lemmon || Mount Lemmon Survey ||  || align=right | 2.0 km || 
|}

595801–595900 

|-bgcolor=#E9E9E9
| 595801 ||  || — || November 21, 2003 || Socorro || LINEAR ||  || align=right | 1.6 km || 
|-id=802 bgcolor=#E9E9E9
| 595802 ||  || — || December 18, 2003 || Socorro || LINEAR ||  || align=right | 2.0 km || 
|-id=803 bgcolor=#fefefe
| 595803 ||  || — || December 23, 2003 || Socorro || LINEAR ||  || align=right data-sort-value="0.85" | 850 m || 
|-id=804 bgcolor=#E9E9E9
| 595804 ||  || — || December 27, 2003 || Socorro || LINEAR ||  || align=right | 2.2 km || 
|-id=805 bgcolor=#E9E9E9
| 595805 ||  || — || April 14, 2005 || Catalina || CSS ||  || align=right | 1.8 km || 
|-id=806 bgcolor=#d6d6d6
| 595806 ||  || — || October 15, 2012 || Haleakala || Pan-STARRS ||  || align=right | 2.0 km || 
|-id=807 bgcolor=#E9E9E9
| 595807 ||  || — || December 21, 2003 || Kitt Peak || Spacewatch ||  || align=right | 2.1 km || 
|-id=808 bgcolor=#E9E9E9
| 595808 ||  || — || December 22, 2003 || Kitt Peak || Spacewatch ||  || align=right data-sort-value="0.98" | 980 m || 
|-id=809 bgcolor=#E9E9E9
| 595809 ||  || — || December 31, 2008 || Mount Lemmon || Mount Lemmon Survey ||  || align=right | 2.0 km || 
|-id=810 bgcolor=#E9E9E9
| 595810 ||  || — || February 27, 2009 || Mount Lemmon || Mount Lemmon Survey ||  || align=right | 1.9 km || 
|-id=811 bgcolor=#E9E9E9
| 595811 ||  || — || November 7, 2012 || Mount Lemmon || Mount Lemmon Survey ||  || align=right | 1.6 km || 
|-id=812 bgcolor=#E9E9E9
| 595812 ||  || — || October 11, 2007 || Mount Lemmon || Mount Lemmon Survey ||  || align=right | 1.5 km || 
|-id=813 bgcolor=#fefefe
| 595813 ||  || — || December 27, 2003 || Kitt Peak || Spacewatch ||  || align=right data-sort-value="0.63" | 630 m || 
|-id=814 bgcolor=#E9E9E9
| 595814 ||  || — || January 23, 2004 || Socorro || LINEAR ||  || align=right | 2.4 km || 
|-id=815 bgcolor=#E9E9E9
| 595815 ||  || — || January 22, 2004 || Socorro || LINEAR ||  || align=right | 2.0 km || 
|-id=816 bgcolor=#fefefe
| 595816 ||  || — || January 19, 2004 || Kitt Peak || Spacewatch || H || align=right data-sort-value="0.50" | 500 m || 
|-id=817 bgcolor=#E9E9E9
| 595817 ||  || — || January 16, 2004 || Palomar || NEAT ||  || align=right | 1.9 km || 
|-id=818 bgcolor=#fefefe
| 595818 ||  || — || January 27, 2004 || Anderson Mesa || LONEOS ||  || align=right data-sort-value="0.62" | 620 m || 
|-id=819 bgcolor=#E9E9E9
| 595819 ||  || — || January 27, 2004 || Catalina || CSS ||  || align=right | 1.2 km || 
|-id=820 bgcolor=#E9E9E9
| 595820 ||  || — || December 31, 2008 || Catalina || CSS ||  || align=right | 2.7 km || 
|-id=821 bgcolor=#E9E9E9
| 595821 ||  || — || October 15, 2007 || Mount Lemmon || Mount Lemmon Survey ||  || align=right | 1.9 km || 
|-id=822 bgcolor=#E9E9E9
| 595822 ||  || — || November 8, 2007 || Mount Lemmon || Mount Lemmon Survey ||  || align=right | 1.7 km || 
|-id=823 bgcolor=#E9E9E9
| 595823 ||  || — || February 24, 2009 || Mount Lemmon || Mount Lemmon Survey ||  || align=right | 1.8 km || 
|-id=824 bgcolor=#fefefe
| 595824 ||  || — || February 8, 2008 || Kitt Peak || Spacewatch ||  || align=right data-sort-value="0.72" | 720 m || 
|-id=825 bgcolor=#fefefe
| 595825 ||  || — || April 25, 2012 || Kitt Peak || Spacewatch ||  || align=right data-sort-value="0.67" | 670 m || 
|-id=826 bgcolor=#fefefe
| 595826 ||  || — || February 11, 2004 || Palomar || NEAT ||  || align=right data-sort-value="0.82" | 820 m || 
|-id=827 bgcolor=#fefefe
| 595827 ||  || — || January 30, 2004 || Kitt Peak || Spacewatch ||  || align=right data-sort-value="0.69" | 690 m || 
|-id=828 bgcolor=#E9E9E9
| 595828 ||  || — || February 12, 2004 || Kitt Peak || Spacewatch ||  || align=right | 1.9 km || 
|-id=829 bgcolor=#fefefe
| 595829 ||  || — || February 11, 2004 || Palomar || NEAT ||  || align=right data-sort-value="0.89" | 890 m || 
|-id=830 bgcolor=#fefefe
| 595830 ||  || — || February 12, 2004 || Kitt Peak || Spacewatch ||  || align=right data-sort-value="0.79" | 790 m || 
|-id=831 bgcolor=#E9E9E9
| 595831 ||  || — || August 17, 2016 || Haleakala || Pan-STARRS ||  || align=right | 2.1 km || 
|-id=832 bgcolor=#E9E9E9
| 595832 ||  || — || February 12, 2004 || Kitt Peak || Spacewatch ||  || align=right | 2.1 km || 
|-id=833 bgcolor=#fefefe
| 595833 ||  || — || February 22, 2004 || Kitt Peak || Spacewatch ||  || align=right data-sort-value="0.70" | 700 m || 
|-id=834 bgcolor=#E9E9E9
| 595834 ||  || — || February 26, 2004 || Kitt Peak || M. W. Buie, D. E. Trilling ||  || align=right | 1.7 km || 
|-id=835 bgcolor=#E9E9E9
| 595835 ||  || — || February 16, 2004 || Kitt Peak || Spacewatch ||  || align=right | 2.5 km || 
|-id=836 bgcolor=#E9E9E9
| 595836 ||  || — || October 18, 2007 || Kitt Peak || Spacewatch ||  || align=right | 1.7 km || 
|-id=837 bgcolor=#d6d6d6
| 595837 ||  || — || February 26, 2004 || Kitt Peak || M. W. Buie, D. E. Trilling ||  || align=right | 1.9 km || 
|-id=838 bgcolor=#E9E9E9
| 595838 ||  || — || February 20, 2009 || Kitt Peak || Spacewatch ||  || align=right | 1.7 km || 
|-id=839 bgcolor=#E9E9E9
| 595839 ||  || — || May 4, 2014 || Haleakala || Pan-STARRS ||  || align=right | 1.7 km || 
|-id=840 bgcolor=#E9E9E9
| 595840 ||  || — || July 2, 2011 || Siding Spring || SSS ||  || align=right | 3.1 km || 
|-id=841 bgcolor=#d6d6d6
| 595841 ||  || — || June 10, 2010 || Catalina || CSS ||  || align=right | 2.7 km || 
|-id=842 bgcolor=#fefefe
| 595842 ||  || — || February 15, 2012 || Haleakala || Pan-STARRS ||  || align=right data-sort-value="0.78" | 780 m || 
|-id=843 bgcolor=#fefefe
| 595843 ||  || — || April 13, 2008 || Kitt Peak || Spacewatch ||  || align=right data-sort-value="0.56" | 560 m || 
|-id=844 bgcolor=#fefefe
| 595844 ||  || — || November 13, 2010 || Mount Lemmon || Mount Lemmon Survey ||  || align=right data-sort-value="0.66" | 660 m || 
|-id=845 bgcolor=#fefefe
| 595845 ||  || — || March 13, 2004 || Palomar || NEAT || NYS || align=right data-sort-value="0.76" | 760 m || 
|-id=846 bgcolor=#E9E9E9
| 595846 ||  || — || March 15, 2004 || Kitt Peak || Spacewatch ||  || align=right data-sort-value="0.99" | 990 m || 
|-id=847 bgcolor=#d6d6d6
| 595847 ||  || — || March 15, 2004 || Kitt Peak || Spacewatch ||  || align=right | 1.9 km || 
|-id=848 bgcolor=#d6d6d6
| 595848 ||  || — || March 15, 2004 || Kitt Peak || Spacewatch ||  || align=right | 3.4 km || 
|-id=849 bgcolor=#fefefe
| 595849 ||  || — || January 13, 2011 || Kitt Peak || Spacewatch ||  || align=right data-sort-value="0.67" | 670 m || 
|-id=850 bgcolor=#d6d6d6
| 595850 ||  || — || February 25, 2014 || Haleakala || Pan-STARRS ||  || align=right | 1.5 km || 
|-id=851 bgcolor=#d6d6d6
| 595851 ||  || — || March 15, 2004 || Kitt Peak || Spacewatch ||  || align=right | 2.1 km || 
|-id=852 bgcolor=#fefefe
| 595852 ||  || — || March 15, 2004 || Kitt Peak || Spacewatch ||  || align=right data-sort-value="0.73" | 730 m || 
|-id=853 bgcolor=#d6d6d6
| 595853 ||  || — || December 21, 2012 || Mount Lemmon || Mount Lemmon Survey ||  || align=right | 1.8 km || 
|-id=854 bgcolor=#fefefe
| 595854 ||  || — || March 22, 2004 || Nogales || P. R. Holvorcem, M. Schwartz || H || align=right data-sort-value="0.95" | 950 m || 
|-id=855 bgcolor=#d6d6d6
| 595855 ||  || — || March 16, 2004 || Kitt Peak || Spacewatch ||  || align=right | 2.0 km || 
|-id=856 bgcolor=#d6d6d6
| 595856 ||  || — || March 16, 2004 || Kitt Peak || Spacewatch ||  || align=right | 2.8 km || 
|-id=857 bgcolor=#E9E9E9
| 595857 ||  || — || March 17, 2004 || Valmeca || C. Demeautis, D. Matter ||  || align=right | 1.2 km || 
|-id=858 bgcolor=#d6d6d6
| 595858 ||  || — || March 17, 2004 || Kitt Peak || Spacewatch ||  || align=right | 2.2 km || 
|-id=859 bgcolor=#d6d6d6
| 595859 ||  || — || March 17, 2004 || Kitt Peak || Spacewatch ||  || align=right | 1.6 km || 
|-id=860 bgcolor=#fefefe
| 595860 ||  || — || March 17, 2004 || Kitt Peak || Spacewatch ||  || align=right data-sort-value="0.46" | 460 m || 
|-id=861 bgcolor=#d6d6d6
| 595861 ||  || — || March 18, 2004 || Kitt Peak || Spacewatch ||  || align=right | 1.7 km || 
|-id=862 bgcolor=#d6d6d6
| 595862 ||  || — || March 21, 2004 || Kitt Peak || Spacewatch ||  || align=right | 2.2 km || 
|-id=863 bgcolor=#E9E9E9
| 595863 ||  || — || March 29, 2004 || Kitt Peak || Spacewatch ||  || align=right data-sort-value="0.93" | 930 m || 
|-id=864 bgcolor=#d6d6d6
| 595864 ||  || — || December 4, 2007 || Kitt Peak || Spacewatch ||  || align=right | 2.6 km || 
|-id=865 bgcolor=#fefefe
| 595865 ||  || — || March 20, 2004 || Kitt Peak || Spacewatch ||  || align=right data-sort-value="0.72" | 720 m || 
|-id=866 bgcolor=#fefefe
| 595866 ||  || — || September 7, 2015 || Catalina || CSS || H || align=right data-sort-value="0.50" | 500 m || 
|-id=867 bgcolor=#fefefe
| 595867 ||  || — || March 27, 2004 || Kitt Peak || Spacewatch ||  || align=right data-sort-value="0.63" | 630 m || 
|-id=868 bgcolor=#fefefe
| 595868 ||  || — || February 13, 2007 || Mount Lemmon || Mount Lemmon Survey ||  || align=right data-sort-value="0.55" | 550 m || 
|-id=869 bgcolor=#fefefe
| 595869 ||  || — || May 3, 2008 || Mount Lemmon || Mount Lemmon Survey ||  || align=right data-sort-value="0.62" | 620 m || 
|-id=870 bgcolor=#d6d6d6
| 595870 ||  || — || March 21, 2015 || Mount Lemmon || Mount Lemmon Survey ||  || align=right | 2.9 km || 
|-id=871 bgcolor=#d6d6d6
| 595871 ||  || — || March 19, 2012 || Ka-Dar || V. Gerke || 3:2 || align=right | 2.7 km || 
|-id=872 bgcolor=#d6d6d6
| 595872 ||  || — || October 28, 2017 || Haleakala || Pan-STARRS ||  || align=right | 2.1 km || 
|-id=873 bgcolor=#d6d6d6
| 595873 ||  || — || July 25, 2017 || Haleakala || Pan-STARRS ||  || align=right | 2.4 km || 
|-id=874 bgcolor=#d6d6d6
| 595874 ||  || — || April 12, 2004 || Siding Spring || SSS ||  || align=right | 2.9 km || 
|-id=875 bgcolor=#E9E9E9
| 595875 ||  || — || April 12, 2004 || Kitt Peak || Spacewatch ||  || align=right | 1.3 km || 
|-id=876 bgcolor=#d6d6d6
| 595876 ||  || — || April 12, 2004 || Kitt Peak || Spacewatch ||  || align=right | 2.3 km || 
|-id=877 bgcolor=#fefefe
| 595877 ||  || — || April 13, 2004 || Kitt Peak || Spacewatch ||  || align=right data-sort-value="0.52" | 520 m || 
|-id=878 bgcolor=#C2FFFF
| 595878 ||  || — || April 14, 2004 || Kitt Peak || Spacewatch || L4 || align=right | 9.3 km || 
|-id=879 bgcolor=#d6d6d6
| 595879 ||  || — || November 12, 2007 || Mount Lemmon || Mount Lemmon Survey ||  || align=right | 2.5 km || 
|-id=880 bgcolor=#fefefe
| 595880 ||  || — || April 12, 2004 || Kitt Peak || Spacewatch ||  || align=right data-sort-value="0.55" | 550 m || 
|-id=881 bgcolor=#E9E9E9
| 595881 ||  || — || April 14, 2004 || Kitt Peak || Spacewatch ||  || align=right data-sort-value="0.99" | 990 m || 
|-id=882 bgcolor=#d6d6d6
| 595882 ||  || — || April 19, 2004 || Kitt Peak || Spacewatch ||  || align=right | 2.1 km || 
|-id=883 bgcolor=#fefefe
| 595883 ||  || — || October 29, 2005 || Kitt Peak || Spacewatch ||  || align=right data-sort-value="0.95" | 950 m || 
|-id=884 bgcolor=#fefefe
| 595884 ||  || — || September 22, 2008 || Kitt Peak || Spacewatch ||  || align=right data-sort-value="0.63" | 630 m || 
|-id=885 bgcolor=#fefefe
| 595885 ||  || — || May 8, 2008 || Mount Lemmon || Mount Lemmon Survey ||  || align=right data-sort-value="0.75" | 750 m || 
|-id=886 bgcolor=#fefefe
| 595886 ||  || — || August 13, 2012 || Haleakala || Pan-STARRS ||  || align=right data-sort-value="0.56" | 560 m || 
|-id=887 bgcolor=#fefefe
| 595887 ||  || — || April 19, 2004 || Kitt Peak || Spacewatch ||  || align=right data-sort-value="0.69" | 690 m || 
|-id=888 bgcolor=#fefefe
| 595888 ||  || — || September 3, 2008 || Kitt Peak || Spacewatch ||  || align=right data-sort-value="0.49" | 490 m || 
|-id=889 bgcolor=#d6d6d6
| 595889 ||  || — || March 21, 2009 || Mount Lemmon || Mount Lemmon Survey ||  || align=right | 1.8 km || 
|-id=890 bgcolor=#fefefe
| 595890 ||  || — || May 9, 2004 || Kitt Peak || Spacewatch || H || align=right data-sort-value="0.58" | 580 m || 
|-id=891 bgcolor=#d6d6d6
| 595891 ||  || — || March 16, 2004 || Kitt Peak || Spacewatch ||  || align=right | 2.4 km || 
|-id=892 bgcolor=#d6d6d6
| 595892 ||  || — || May 13, 2004 || Kitt Peak || Spacewatch ||  || align=right | 2.5 km || 
|-id=893 bgcolor=#E9E9E9
| 595893 ||  || — || October 1, 2009 || Mount Lemmon || Mount Lemmon Survey ||  || align=right | 1.1 km || 
|-id=894 bgcolor=#C2FFFF
| 595894 ||  || — || February 28, 2014 || Haleakala || Pan-STARRS || L4 || align=right | 7.2 km || 
|-id=895 bgcolor=#d6d6d6
| 595895 ||  || — || May 20, 2004 || Kitt Peak || Spacewatch ||  || align=right | 3.1 km || 
|-id=896 bgcolor=#E9E9E9
| 595896 ||  || — || May 23, 2004 || Kitt Peak || Spacewatch ||  || align=right data-sort-value="0.80" | 800 m || 
|-id=897 bgcolor=#fefefe
| 595897 ||  || — || April 17, 2012 || Catalina || CSS || H || align=right data-sort-value="0.86" | 860 m || 
|-id=898 bgcolor=#d6d6d6
| 595898 ||  || — || May 7, 2014 || Haleakala || Pan-STARRS ||  || align=right | 2.2 km || 
|-id=899 bgcolor=#FA8072
| 595899 ||  || — || July 19, 2015 || Haleakala || Pan-STARRS || H || align=right data-sort-value="0.55" | 550 m || 
|-id=900 bgcolor=#d6d6d6
| 595900 ||  || — || August 31, 2005 || Kitt Peak || Spacewatch ||  || align=right | 2.2 km || 
|}

595901–596000 

|-bgcolor=#C2FFFF
| 595901 ||  || — || June 23, 2004 || Mauna Kea || J. Pittichová, J. Bedient || L4 || align=right | 7.6 km || 
|-id=902 bgcolor=#E9E9E9
| 595902 ||  || — || May 27, 2008 || Mount Lemmon || Mount Lemmon Survey ||  || align=right | 1.2 km || 
|-id=903 bgcolor=#d6d6d6
| 595903 ||  || — || May 26, 2014 || Haleakala || Pan-STARRS ||  || align=right | 2.4 km || 
|-id=904 bgcolor=#fefefe
| 595904 ||  || — || July 14, 2004 || Socorro || LINEAR || H || align=right data-sort-value="0.60" | 600 m || 
|-id=905 bgcolor=#d6d6d6
| 595905 ||  || — || September 18, 2010 || Mount Lemmon || Mount Lemmon Survey ||  || align=right | 2.2 km || 
|-id=906 bgcolor=#d6d6d6
| 595906 ||  || — || August 8, 2004 || Palomar || NEAT ||  || align=right | 2.4 km || 
|-id=907 bgcolor=#E9E9E9
| 595907 ||  || — || August 7, 2004 || Palomar || NEAT ||  || align=right | 1.2 km || 
|-id=908 bgcolor=#d6d6d6
| 595908 ||  || — || August 8, 2004 || Palomar || NEAT ||  || align=right | 2.7 km || 
|-id=909 bgcolor=#d6d6d6
| 595909 ||  || — || August 12, 2004 || Socorro || LINEAR ||  || align=right | 1.7 km || 
|-id=910 bgcolor=#fefefe
| 595910 ||  || — || August 7, 2004 || Palomar || NEAT || H || align=right data-sort-value="0.87" | 870 m || 
|-id=911 bgcolor=#E9E9E9
| 595911 ||  || — || August 9, 2004 || Socorro || LINEAR ||  || align=right data-sort-value="0.98" | 980 m || 
|-id=912 bgcolor=#E9E9E9
| 595912 ||  || — || August 11, 2004 || Socorro || LINEAR ||  || align=right data-sort-value="0.81" | 810 m || 
|-id=913 bgcolor=#fefefe
| 595913 ||  || — || August 15, 2004 || Pla D'Arguines || R. Ferrando ||  || align=right data-sort-value="0.76" | 760 m || 
|-id=914 bgcolor=#d6d6d6
| 595914 ||  || — || August 13, 2004 || Palomar || NEAT ||  || align=right | 4.1 km || 
|-id=915 bgcolor=#d6d6d6
| 595915 ||  || — || August 10, 2004 || Palomar || NEAT ||  || align=right | 3.7 km || 
|-id=916 bgcolor=#d6d6d6
| 595916 ||  || — || August 20, 2004 || Kitt Peak || Spacewatch ||  || align=right | 2.0 km || 
|-id=917 bgcolor=#d6d6d6
| 595917 ||  || — || March 13, 2008 || Kitt Peak || Spacewatch ||  || align=right | 2.8 km || 
|-id=918 bgcolor=#fefefe
| 595918 ||  || — || March 13, 2007 || Kitt Peak || Spacewatch ||  || align=right data-sort-value="0.60" | 600 m || 
|-id=919 bgcolor=#d6d6d6
| 595919 ||  || — || May 22, 2014 || Mount Lemmon || Mount Lemmon Survey ||  || align=right | 2.1 km || 
|-id=920 bgcolor=#E9E9E9
| 595920 ||  || — || August 23, 2004 || Kitt Peak || Spacewatch ||  || align=right | 1.9 km || 
|-id=921 bgcolor=#d6d6d6
| 595921 ||  || — || August 23, 2004 || Kitt Peak || Spacewatch ||  || align=right | 2.5 km || 
|-id=922 bgcolor=#E9E9E9
| 595922 ||  || — || August 21, 2004 || Mauna Kea || Mauna Kea Obs. ||  || align=right data-sort-value="0.85" | 850 m || 
|-id=923 bgcolor=#fefefe
| 595923 ||  || — || July 30, 2008 || Kitt Peak || Spacewatch ||  || align=right data-sort-value="0.81" | 810 m || 
|-id=924 bgcolor=#fefefe
| 595924 ||  || — || July 29, 2008 || Kitt Peak || Spacewatch ||  || align=right data-sort-value="0.64" | 640 m || 
|-id=925 bgcolor=#E9E9E9
| 595925 ||  || — || April 9, 2015 || Mount Lemmon || Mount Lemmon Survey ||  || align=right data-sort-value="0.93" | 930 m || 
|-id=926 bgcolor=#E9E9E9
| 595926 ||  || — || August 22, 2004 || Kitt Peak || Spacewatch ||  || align=right data-sort-value="0.80" | 800 m || 
|-id=927 bgcolor=#d6d6d6
| 595927 ||  || — || July 12, 2010 || WISE || WISE ||  || align=right | 2.7 km || 
|-id=928 bgcolor=#d6d6d6
| 595928 ||  || — || September 10, 2015 || Haleakala || Pan-STARRS ||  || align=right | 2.3 km || 
|-id=929 bgcolor=#d6d6d6
| 595929 ||  || — || October 14, 2010 || Mount Lemmon || Mount Lemmon Survey ||  || align=right | 2.0 km || 
|-id=930 bgcolor=#fefefe
| 595930 ||  || — || October 23, 2011 || Mount Lemmon || Mount Lemmon Survey ||  || align=right data-sort-value="0.54" | 540 m || 
|-id=931 bgcolor=#fefefe
| 595931 ||  || — || August 22, 2004 || Kitt Peak || Spacewatch ||  || align=right data-sort-value="0.52" | 520 m || 
|-id=932 bgcolor=#E9E9E9
| 595932 ||  || — || September 7, 2004 || Palomar || NEAT ||  || align=right | 2.3 km || 
|-id=933 bgcolor=#E9E9E9
| 595933 ||  || — || August 15, 2004 || Palomar || NEAT ||  || align=right | 1.9 km || 
|-id=934 bgcolor=#fefefe
| 595934 ||  || — || August 7, 2004 || Palomar || NEAT || H || align=right data-sort-value="0.82" | 820 m || 
|-id=935 bgcolor=#fefefe
| 595935 ||  || — || September 6, 2004 || Siding Spring || SSS ||  || align=right data-sort-value="0.60" | 600 m || 
|-id=936 bgcolor=#d6d6d6
| 595936 ||  || — || August 12, 2004 || Campo Imperatore || CINEOS ||  || align=right | 2.7 km || 
|-id=937 bgcolor=#FA8072
| 595937 ||  || — || September 8, 2004 || Socorro || LINEAR ||  || align=right data-sort-value="0.61" | 610 m || 
|-id=938 bgcolor=#d6d6d6
| 595938 ||  || — || September 8, 2004 || Socorro || LINEAR ||  || align=right | 2.5 km || 
|-id=939 bgcolor=#E9E9E9
| 595939 ||  || — || September 8, 2004 || Socorro || LINEAR ||  || align=right data-sort-value="0.68" | 680 m || 
|-id=940 bgcolor=#E9E9E9
| 595940 ||  || — || September 8, 2004 || Socorro || LINEAR ||  || align=right | 2.0 km || 
|-id=941 bgcolor=#d6d6d6
| 595941 ||  || — || September 7, 2004 || Kitt Peak || Spacewatch ||  || align=right | 2.1 km || 
|-id=942 bgcolor=#d6d6d6
| 595942 ||  || — || August 25, 2004 || Kitt Peak || Spacewatch ||  || align=right | 2.7 km || 
|-id=943 bgcolor=#E9E9E9
| 595943 ||  || — || September 8, 1996 || Kitt Peak || Spacewatch ||  || align=right | 1.0 km || 
|-id=944 bgcolor=#d6d6d6
| 595944 ||  || — || September 7, 2004 || Kitt Peak || Spacewatch ||  || align=right | 2.4 km || 
|-id=945 bgcolor=#d6d6d6
| 595945 ||  || — || September 7, 2004 || Kitt Peak || Spacewatch ||  || align=right | 2.4 km || 
|-id=946 bgcolor=#E9E9E9
| 595946 ||  || — || September 7, 2004 || Kitt Peak || Spacewatch ||  || align=right data-sort-value="0.81" | 810 m || 
|-id=947 bgcolor=#E9E9E9
| 595947 ||  || — || February 12, 2011 || Mount Lemmon || Mount Lemmon Survey ||  || align=right | 1.6 km || 
|-id=948 bgcolor=#d6d6d6
| 595948 ||  || — || September 7, 2004 || Kitt Peak || Spacewatch ||  || align=right | 2.2 km || 
|-id=949 bgcolor=#d6d6d6
| 595949 ||  || — || August 11, 2004 || Palomar || NEAT ||  || align=right | 3.7 km || 
|-id=950 bgcolor=#d6d6d6
| 595950 ||  || — || August 15, 2004 || Siding Spring || SSS ||  || align=right | 2.9 km || 
|-id=951 bgcolor=#fefefe
| 595951 ||  || — || September 8, 2004 || Palomar || NEAT ||  || align=right data-sort-value="0.86" | 860 m || 
|-id=952 bgcolor=#E9E9E9
| 595952 ||  || — || September 8, 2004 || Klet || M. Tichý ||  || align=right | 1.5 km || 
|-id=953 bgcolor=#fefefe
| 595953 ||  || — || August 16, 2004 || Palomar || NEAT ||  || align=right | 1.1 km || 
|-id=954 bgcolor=#FA8072
| 595954 ||  || — || July 15, 2004 || Socorro || LINEAR ||  || align=right data-sort-value="0.75" | 750 m || 
|-id=955 bgcolor=#E9E9E9
| 595955 ||  || — || September 11, 2004 || Socorro || LINEAR ||  || align=right | 1.1 km || 
|-id=956 bgcolor=#d6d6d6
| 595956 ||  || — || August 10, 2004 || Palomar || NEAT ||  || align=right | 4.3 km || 
|-id=957 bgcolor=#d6d6d6
| 595957 ||  || — || September 10, 2004 || Kitt Peak || Spacewatch ||  || align=right | 2.6 km || 
|-id=958 bgcolor=#fefefe
| 595958 ||  || — || September 10, 2004 || Kitt Peak || Spacewatch ||  || align=right data-sort-value="0.57" | 570 m || 
|-id=959 bgcolor=#fefefe
| 595959 ||  || — || September 10, 2004 || Kitt Peak || Spacewatch ||  || align=right data-sort-value="0.49" | 490 m || 
|-id=960 bgcolor=#E9E9E9
| 595960 ||  || — || September 10, 2004 || Kitt Peak || Spacewatch ||  || align=right | 1.5 km || 
|-id=961 bgcolor=#d6d6d6
| 595961 ||  || — || September 10, 2004 || Kitt Peak || Spacewatch ||  || align=right | 2.3 km || 
|-id=962 bgcolor=#d6d6d6
| 595962 ||  || — || September 11, 2004 || Kitt Peak || Spacewatch ||  || align=right | 2.1 km || 
|-id=963 bgcolor=#E9E9E9
| 595963 ||  || — || July 17, 2004 || Cerro Tololo || Cerro Tololo Obs. ||  || align=right data-sort-value="0.94" | 940 m || 
|-id=964 bgcolor=#d6d6d6
| 595964 ||  || — || September 15, 2004 || Kitt Peak || Spacewatch ||  || align=right | 2.8 km || 
|-id=965 bgcolor=#d6d6d6
| 595965 ||  || — || September 11, 2004 || Kitt Peak || Spacewatch ||  || align=right | 2.9 km || 
|-id=966 bgcolor=#d6d6d6
| 595966 ||  || — || September 11, 2004 || Kitt Peak || Spacewatch ||  || align=right | 2.3 km || 
|-id=967 bgcolor=#E9E9E9
| 595967 ||  || — || August 7, 2004 || Palomar || NEAT ||  || align=right | 1.3 km || 
|-id=968 bgcolor=#E9E9E9
| 595968 ||  || — || September 15, 2004 || Kitt Peak || Spacewatch ||  || align=right data-sort-value="0.87" | 870 m || 
|-id=969 bgcolor=#E9E9E9
| 595969 ||  || — || September 14, 2004 || Palomar || NEAT ||  || align=right | 1.1 km || 
|-id=970 bgcolor=#d6d6d6
| 595970 ||  || — || November 22, 2006 || Kitt Peak || Spacewatch || 3:2 || align=right | 5.5 km || 
|-id=971 bgcolor=#d6d6d6
| 595971 ||  || — || September 8, 2004 || Socorro || LINEAR ||  || align=right | 3.6 km || 
|-id=972 bgcolor=#E9E9E9
| 595972 ||  || — || September 17, 2012 || Nogales || M. Schwartz, P. R. Holvorcem ||  || align=right | 1.1 km || 
|-id=973 bgcolor=#d6d6d6
| 595973 ||  || — || April 14, 2008 || Mount Lemmon || Mount Lemmon Survey ||  || align=right | 2.5 km || 
|-id=974 bgcolor=#E9E9E9
| 595974 ||  || — || September 28, 2008 || Mount Lemmon || Mount Lemmon Survey ||  || align=right data-sort-value="0.92" | 920 m || 
|-id=975 bgcolor=#d6d6d6
| 595975 ||  || — || April 15, 2008 || Mount Lemmon || Mount Lemmon Survey ||  || align=right | 2.2 km || 
|-id=976 bgcolor=#d6d6d6
| 595976 ||  || — || April 15, 2008 || Mount Lemmon || Mount Lemmon Survey ||  || align=right | 2.8 km || 
|-id=977 bgcolor=#d6d6d6
| 595977 ||  || — || December 24, 2017 || Haleakala || Pan-STARRS ||  || align=right | 2.4 km || 
|-id=978 bgcolor=#d6d6d6
| 595978 ||  || — || February 12, 2012 || Mount Lemmon || Mount Lemmon Survey ||  || align=right | 2.9 km || 
|-id=979 bgcolor=#E9E9E9
| 595979 ||  || — || September 10, 2004 || Kitt Peak || Spacewatch ||  || align=right data-sort-value="0.92" | 920 m || 
|-id=980 bgcolor=#E9E9E9
| 595980 ||  || — || September 7, 2004 || Kitt Peak || Spacewatch ||  || align=right data-sort-value="0.63" | 630 m || 
|-id=981 bgcolor=#E9E9E9
| 595981 ||  || — || September 26, 2000 || Kitt Peak || Spacewatch ||  || align=right data-sort-value="0.80" | 800 m || 
|-id=982 bgcolor=#fefefe
| 595982 ||  || — || September 10, 2004 || Socorro || LINEAR ||  || align=right data-sort-value="0.61" | 610 m || 
|-id=983 bgcolor=#d6d6d6
| 595983 ||  || — || September 21, 2004 || Socorro || LINEAR ||  || align=right | 2.5 km || 
|-id=984 bgcolor=#fefefe
| 595984 ||  || — || August 7, 2015 || Haleakala || Pan-STARRS || H || align=right data-sort-value="0.61" | 610 m || 
|-id=985 bgcolor=#d6d6d6
| 595985 ||  || — || January 19, 2012 || Haleakala || Pan-STARRS ||  || align=right | 2.6 km || 
|-id=986 bgcolor=#fefefe
| 595986 ||  || — || April 15, 2007 || Kitt Peak || Spacewatch ||  || align=right data-sort-value="0.62" | 620 m || 
|-id=987 bgcolor=#E9E9E9
| 595987 ||  || — || August 20, 2008 || Kitt Peak || Spacewatch ||  || align=right | 1.0 km || 
|-id=988 bgcolor=#d6d6d6
| 595988 ||  || — || September 23, 2015 || Haleakala || Pan-STARRS ||  || align=right | 2.4 km || 
|-id=989 bgcolor=#fefefe
| 595989 ||  || — || October 5, 2004 || Three Buttes || G. R. Jones ||  || align=right data-sort-value="0.57" | 570 m || 
|-id=990 bgcolor=#d6d6d6
| 595990 ||  || — || October 4, 2004 || Kitt Peak || Spacewatch ||  || align=right | 2.8 km || 
|-id=991 bgcolor=#d6d6d6
| 595991 ||  || — || October 4, 2004 || Kitt Peak || Spacewatch ||  || align=right | 2.1 km || 
|-id=992 bgcolor=#E9E9E9
| 595992 ||  || — || October 4, 2004 || Kitt Peak || Spacewatch ||  || align=right | 1.6 km || 
|-id=993 bgcolor=#d6d6d6
| 595993 ||  || — || October 4, 2004 || Kitt Peak || Spacewatch ||  || align=right | 1.9 km || 
|-id=994 bgcolor=#d6d6d6
| 595994 ||  || — || October 4, 2004 || Kitt Peak || Spacewatch ||  || align=right | 3.4 km || 
|-id=995 bgcolor=#d6d6d6
| 595995 ||  || — || October 5, 2004 || Kitt Peak || Spacewatch ||  || align=right | 2.7 km || 
|-id=996 bgcolor=#E9E9E9
| 595996 ||  || — || October 4, 2004 || Apache Point || J. C. Barentine ||  || align=right | 1.0 km || 
|-id=997 bgcolor=#E9E9E9
| 595997 ||  || — || October 4, 2004 || Kitt Peak || Spacewatch ||  || align=right data-sort-value="0.84" | 840 m || 
|-id=998 bgcolor=#d6d6d6
| 595998 ||  || — || September 12, 2004 || Kitt Peak || Spacewatch ||  || align=right | 2.4 km || 
|-id=999 bgcolor=#d6d6d6
| 595999 ||  || — || October 7, 2004 || Kitt Peak || Spacewatch ||  || align=right | 2.2 km || 
|-id=000 bgcolor=#E9E9E9
| 596000 ||  || — || September 23, 2004 || Kitt Peak || Spacewatch ||  || align=right | 1.2 km || 
|}

References

External links 
 Discovery Circumstances: Numbered Minor Planets (595001)–(600000) (IAU Minor Planet Center)

0595